= ITX =

ITX may refer to:

- Isopropylthioxanthone, a chemical
- Information Technology eXtended, computer form factor:
  - Mini-ITX
  - Nano-ITX
  - Pico-ITX
  - Mobile-ITX
- Intercity Train eXpress, a group of Korail intercity services, South Korea

== See also ==
- ITX-Cheongchun, a class of train
- ITX-Saemaeul, a class of train
