= Pico-ITXe =

Pico-ITXe is a PC Pico-ITX motherboard specification created by VIA Technologies and SFF-SIG. It was announced by VIA Technologies on October 29, 2008, and released in December 2008. The Pico-ITXe specifications call for the board to be 10 × 7.2 cm (3.9 × 2.8 in), which is half the area of Nano-ITX, and 12 layers deep. The processor can be a VIA C7 that uses VIA's NanoBGA2 technology. It uses DDR2 667/533 SO-DIMM memory, with support for up to 2GB. Video is supplied by VIA's Chrome9 HC3 GPU with built-in MPEG-2, 4, WMV9, and VC1 decoding acceleration. The BIOS is a 4 or 8 Mbit Award BIOS.

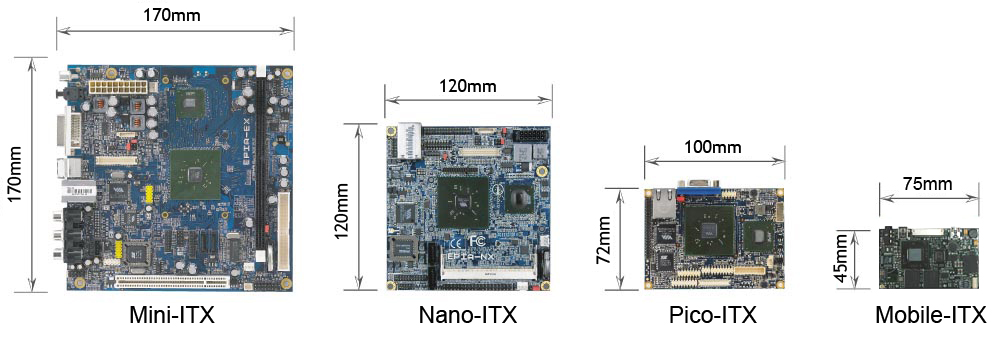
ITX motherboard form factor comparison

== EPIA-P710 ==
The first motherboard that was produced under this specification is called EPIA-P710. It was released in December 2008. It is 10 × 7.2 cm (3.9 × 2.8 in) and 12 layers deep. The operating temperature range is from 0°C to about 50 °C. The operating humidity level (relative and non-condensing) can be from 0% to about 95%. It uses a 1 GHz VIA C7-M processor, a VIA VX800 chip set, and is RoHS compliant. It has onboard VGA video-out. Gigabit Ethernet is supplied by VIA's VT6122, but requires a connector board. HD 5.1 channel audio is provided by a VIA VT1708B chip.

The following are the standard I/O connections:

- 2× SUMIT QMS/QFS series connectors by Samtec
- 1× GigaLAN pin header
- 1× Audio Pin Connector for Line-out, Line-in, MIC-in
- 1× Front Panel pin header
- 1× CRT pin header
- 1× UDMA 100/133 44-pin PATA
- 1× 3 Gbit/s SATA
- DVI and LVDS video-out
- USB 2.0
- COM
- PS/2 Mouse & Keyboard

Up to four I/O expansion boards can be stacked upon each other using the SUMIT interface.

== See also ==
- Pico-ITX
- Mini-ITX
- Mobile-ITX
- EPIA
- Ultra-Mobile PC
