= VIA Eden =

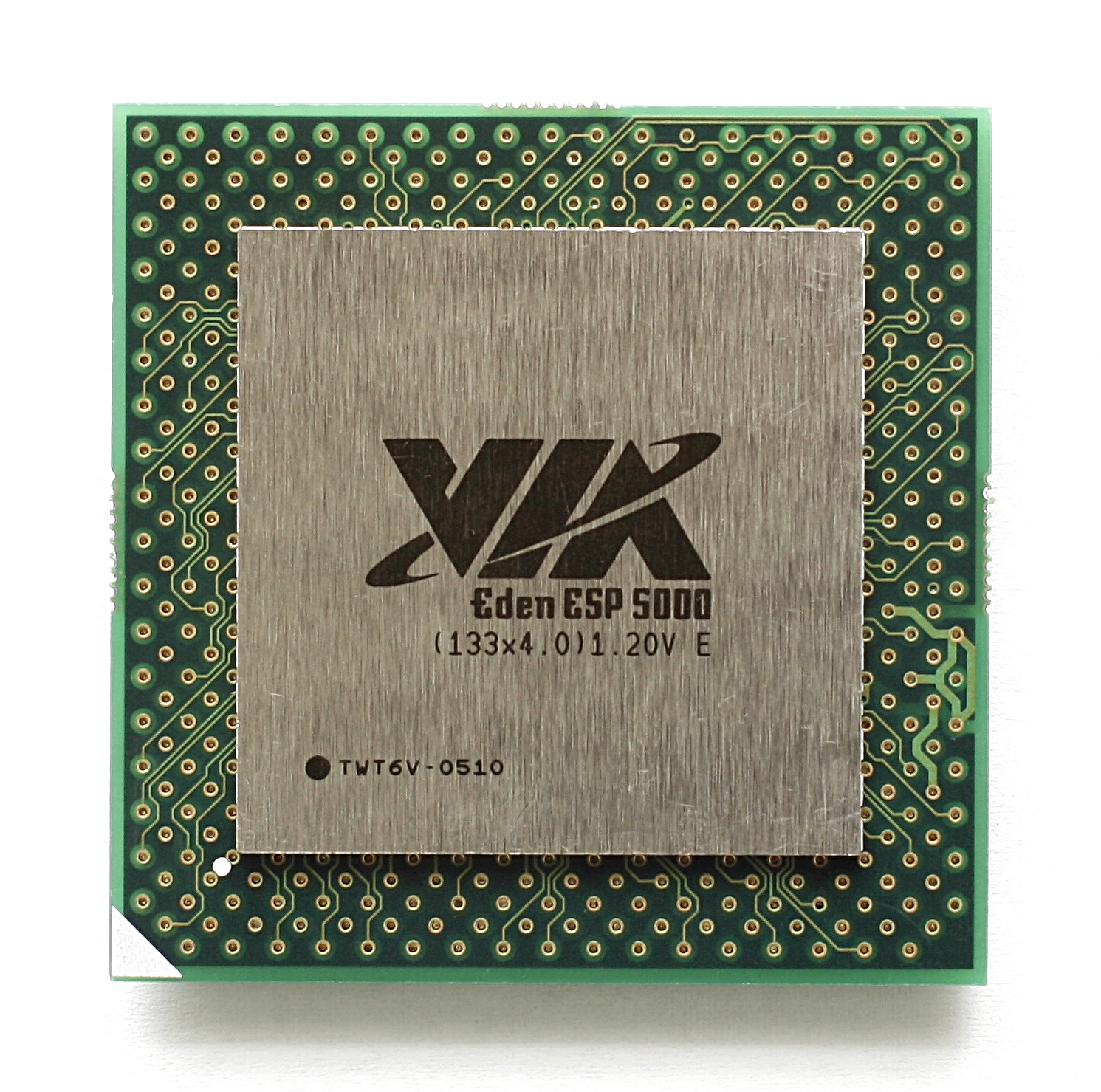
Eden ESP5000 533 MHz processor

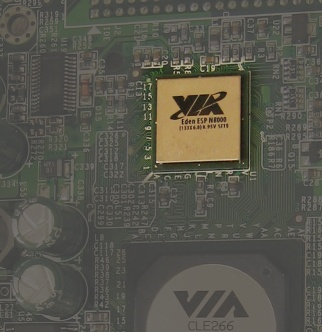
Eden-N 800 MHz processor, next to capacitors and VIA CLE266 northbridge. Its size is only 1.5×1.5cm (heatsink removed).

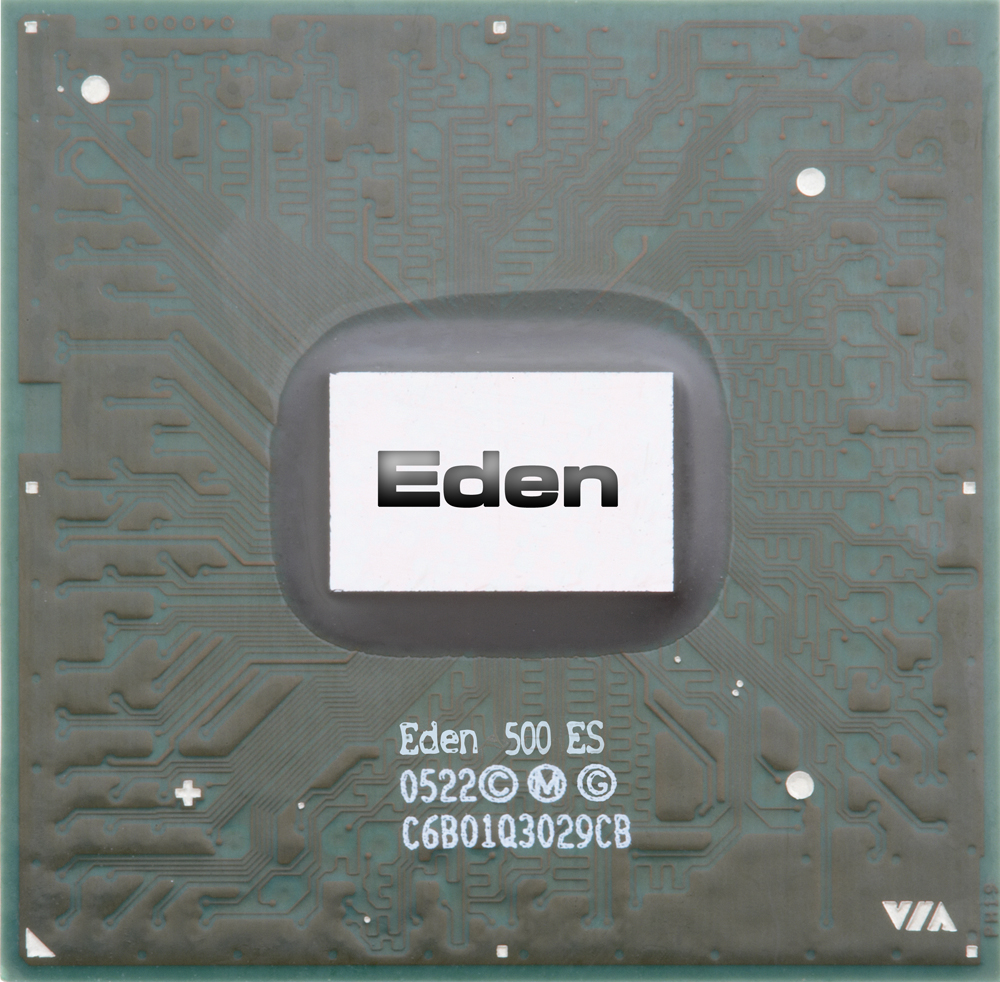
Eden ULV 500 MHz prozessor

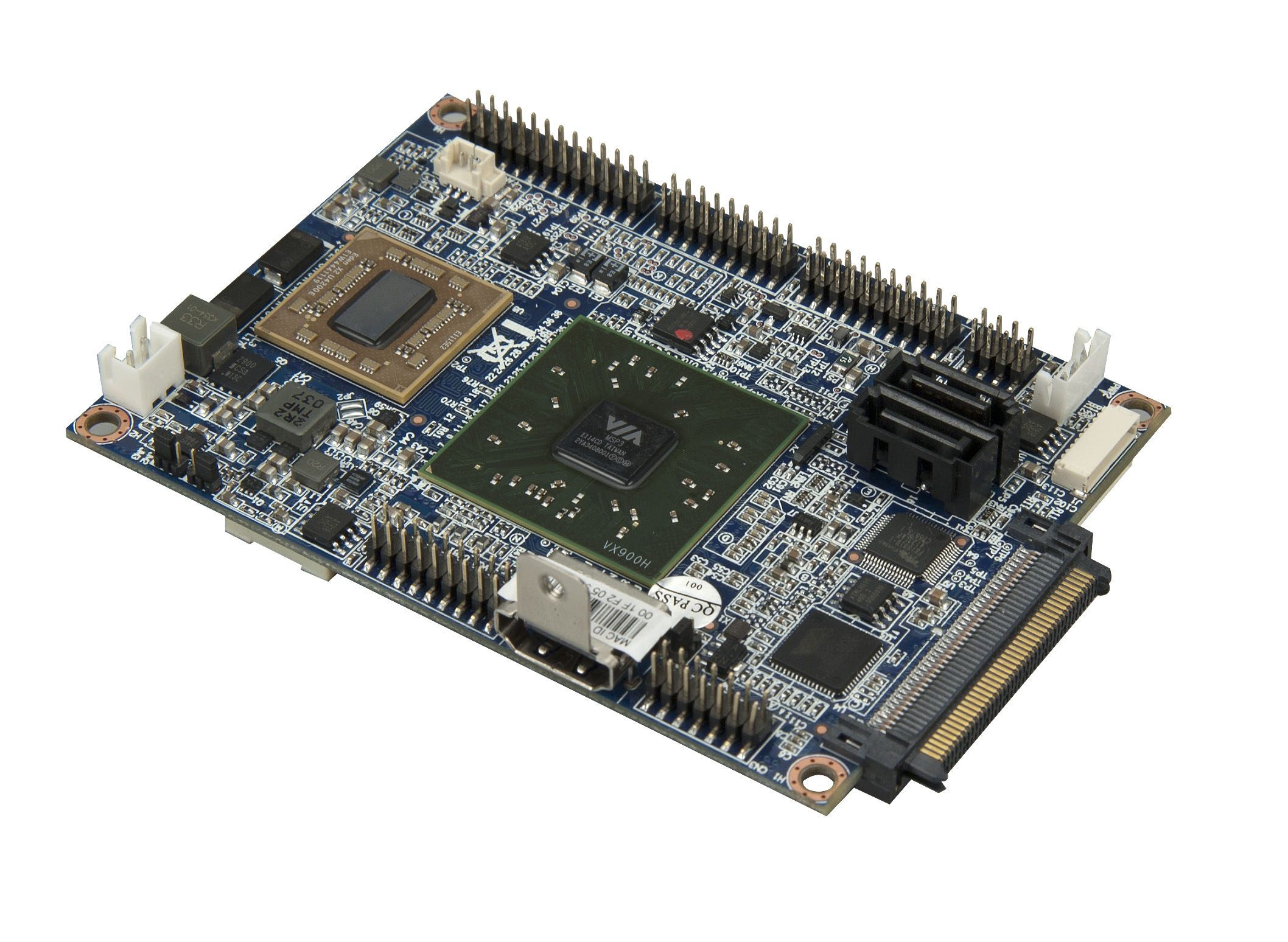
Pico-ITX motherboard with VIA Eden X2 1 GHz processor

VIA Eden is a variant of VIA's C3/C7 x86 processors, designed to be used in embedded devices. They have smaller package sizes, lower power consumption, and somewhat lower computing performance than their C equivalents, due to reduced clock rates. They are often used in EPIA mini-ITX, nano-ITX, and Pico-ITX motherboards. In addition to x86 instruction decoding, the processors have a second undocumented Alternate Instruction Set.

The Eden is available in four main versions:

Name	Core	Clock speed	Package	FSB
Eden ESP	Samuel 2 and Nehemiah cores	300 MHz–1.0 GHz	EBGA 35mm×35mm	66/100/133 MHz
Eden-N	Nehemiah core	533 MHz–1.0 GHz	NanoBGA 15mm×15mm	133 MHz
Eden	Esther core	400 MHz–1.2 GHz	NanoBGA2 21mm×21mm	400 MT/s FSB
Eden ULV	Esther core	500 MHz–1.5 GHz	NanoBGA2 21mm×21mm	400 MT/s FSB

The Eden ULV 500 MHz was the first variant to achieve a TDP of 1W .

== See also ==
- List of VIA Eden microprocessors
