= Ncase M1 =

Discontinued small form factor computer case

- Invented by: "Wahaha360" and "Necere"
- Manufacturer: Lian Li
- Introduced: 2014
- Discontinued: October 2021
- Type: Mini-ITX small form-factor computer case
- Dimensions: 240 mm (H) x 160 mm (W) x 328 mm (D)

The Ncase M1 is a crowdfunded small form-factor (SFF) computer case designed for the Mini-ITX motherboard format. Developed by users "Wahaha360" and "Necere" from the online hardware community HardForum, the case was manufactured by Lian Li. The M1 is noted for its compact, high-performance design capable of housing full-size components, such as large video cards and 240 mm radiators for liquid cooling, which was uncommon on the market at the time.

The product was officially discontinued in October 2021, with its creators citing evolving component requirements and shifts in the market.

== History ==
The concept for the Ncase M1 originated in a 2012 thread on the computer hardware enthusiast website [H]ard|Forum. The designers, identified by their forum handles "Wahaha360" and "Necere", sought to create a case that could support a wide range of high-end hardware to address a lack of high performance mini-ITX cases on the market. The goal was to accommodate full-length GPUs and robust cooling solutions, which were not well supported in Mini-ITX cases at the time.

The project was funded through Indiegogo. The first production run of 600 units was manufactured by Taiwanese company Lian Li, a well-known maker of aluminum computer cases. The initial cost was US$205.

== Design ==
The Ncase M1 was designed with an emphasis on space efficiency and component compatibility. The chassis featured removable 1.5 mm thick brushed aluminum panels on all sides. To maximize internal space, it used an unconventional layout with the power supply mounted at the front of the case. The side and top panels were heavily perforated to allow for ventilation, with optional magnetic dust filters included.

Its internal layout was engineered to support a wide range of high-performance components despite its compact 12.7-liter volume, including:

- A CPU cooler up to 130 mm in height.
- A dual-slot graphics card up to 12.5 inches in length.
- A side-mounted 240 mm liquid cooling radiator, or two 120 mm fans.
- A slot-loading slim optical disc drive.
- Multiple storage drives, with modular brackets supporting up to three 3.5-inch drives or several 2.5-inch drives.
- Both SFX and ATX power supplies (the latter requiring an adapter bracket and limiting GPU length).

This level of compatibility was uncommon in SFF cases at the time of its debut and set a standard for subsequent designs in the market.

== Reception ==
The Ncase M1 was met with critical acclaim. PC Perspective awarded it an "Editor's Choice", calling it a "beautifully simple enclosure" and a potential "new benchmark for mini-ITX cases". The review praised its "ultra-light" aluminum construction and minimalist design, concluding that it had no significant drawbacks for its intended purpose. Silent PC Review described it as a "gorgeous and surprisingly compact" passion project with a "well-conceived design" and excellent usability. However, the review noted some minor flaws, including a cooling layout that favored specific component types, a thin fan bracket that could cause vibration, and filters that were difficult to install. Both publications acknowledged the high price of US$205 as expensive, but justified for enthusiasts seeking a premium product.

TechSpot described the M1 as "excellent" and "one of the better small form factor cases on the market". According to Sean Hollister of The Verge, the M1 was "the best computer case I’ve ever owned, one that I plan to keep using for years" and "Ncase helped change the face of SFF cases". The success of the M1 inspired competing designs such as the Cooler Master NR200 and the Lian Li TU-150.

== Discontinuation ==
In October 2021, co-creator Wahaha360 announced that production of the M1 would cease. He cited evolving component requirements and shifts in the market for the decision. According to Hollister, although the M1 "isn’t a product that’s particularly out of date or where demand has suddenly dried up ... it is true that some of the oversized coolers on the most recent generation of graphics cards keeps many of them from fitting well in the M1."
