= Octagon Systems =

American computer company

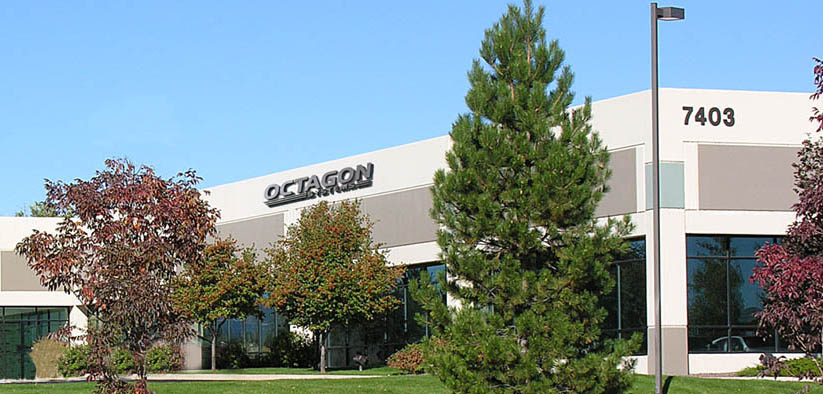
- Type: Private
- Industry: Computer hardware; Industrial computers; Electronic hardware
- Founded: August 1, 1981; 45 years ago in Westminster, Colorado, U.S.
- Headquarters: Westminster, Colorado, U.S.
- Products: Industrial computers; Rugged computers; Mobile computers; Military computers; Vehicle computers; Transportation computers; Mining computers
- Website: www.octagonsystems.com

Octagon Systems Corporation was an industrial computer design and manufacturing company originally based in Westminster, Colorado. Octagon Systems designed, manufactured, sold, repaired and supported its line of industrial, mobile and rugged computer systems for industries including mining, military, transportation and others. The company had international representatives in Africa, Asia, Europe, North America and South America.

== History ==
=== Early years (1980s) ===
Octagon Systems was founded in 1981, and introduced an embedded computer with a high level language and software development system and operating systems on a solid state disk. Octagon’s services and systems grew with industrial computer systems including the STD Bus market and development of single-board computers. Octagon Systems has been ISO certified since 1993.

=== New applications (2000s) ===
Octagon Systems’ XMB Mobile Servers were mentioned by the trade press in 2006. Octagon Systems was a founding member of the Small Form Factor Special Interest Group in 2007.

Octagon co-authored the EPIC embedded computing specification. Octagon’s products were used in public transportation systems, rugged computing systems for mining operations as well as others.

=== Industry expansion (2010s) ===
Octagon Systems products expanded into new markets continuing the sell of industrial, transportation and rugged computer systems. The U.S. Navy chose Octagon’s products for a contract to support amphibious warfare computing, and Octagon products were deployed in mines.

=== Acquired (2018) ===
In 2018, J-Squared Technologies acquired the TRAX family of Octagon products. The Westminster manufacturing facility was closed.
