= Small form factor PC =

Form factor for desktop computers and motherboards

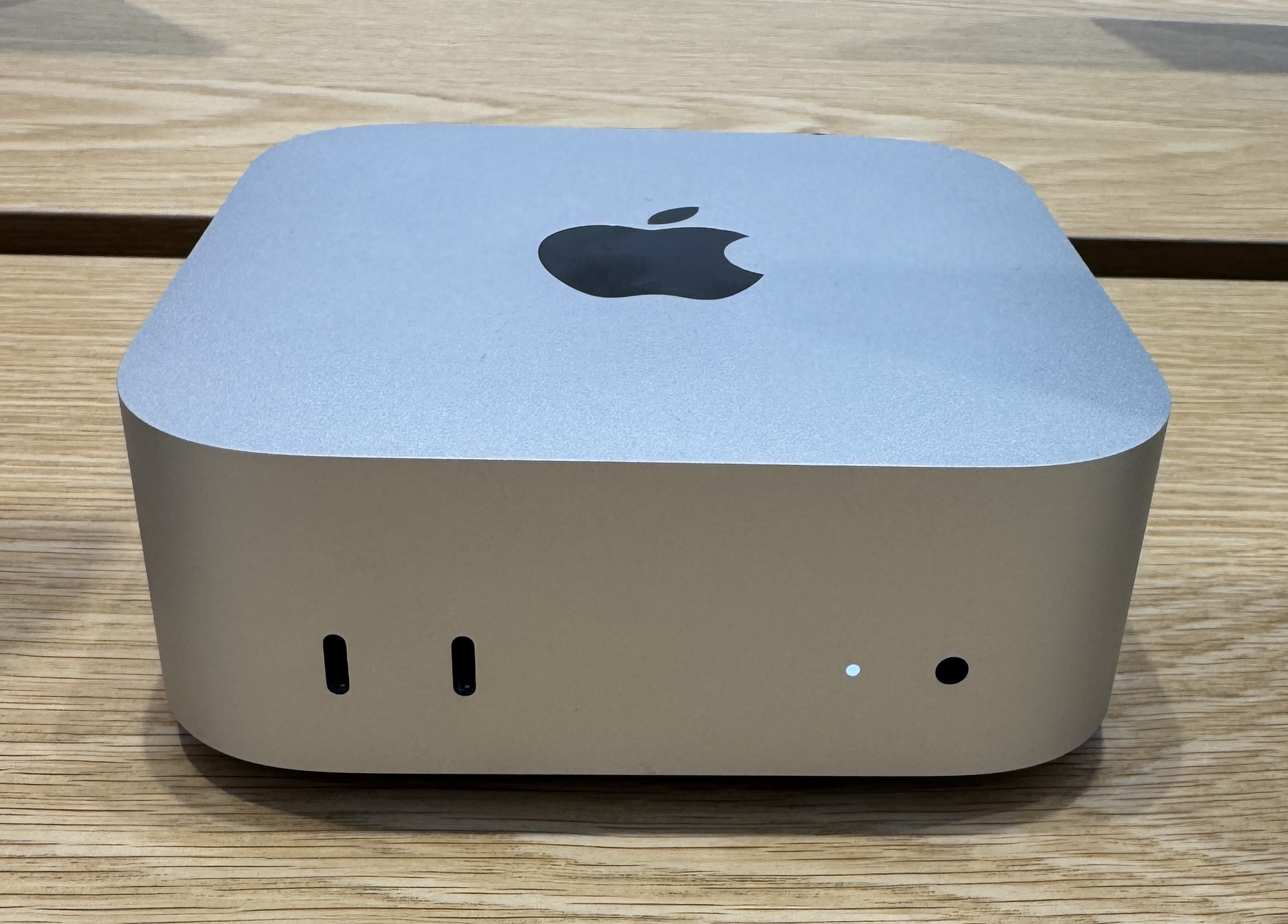
Mac Mini, a popular small form factor computer made by Apple

Small form factor (SFF) is a classification of desktop computers and for some of their components, chassis and motherboard, to indicate that they are designed in accordance with one of smaller standard form factors, intended to minimize the volume and area occupied by the computer, compared to the standard ATX form factor.

For comparison purposes, the volume of an SFF case is usually measured in litres. SFFs are available in a variety of sizes and shapes, including shoeboxes, cubes, and book-sized PCs. Their smaller and often lighter construction has made them popular as home theater PCs and as gaming computers for attending LAN parties. Manufacturers also emphasize the aesthetic and ergonomic design of SFFs since users are more likely to place them on top of a desk or carry them around. Advancements in technology combined with a reduced size enables a powerful computer to be a smaller size.

Small form factor designs do not include computing devices that have traditionally been small, such as embedded or mobile systems. However, "small form factor" lacks a normative definition and is consequently open to interpretation and misuse. Manufacturers often provide definitions that serve the interests of their products. According to marketing strategy, one manufacturer may decide to mark their product as "small form factor" while other manufacturers are using different marketing name (such as "Minitower", "Microtower" or "Desktop") for personal computers of similar or even smaller footprint.

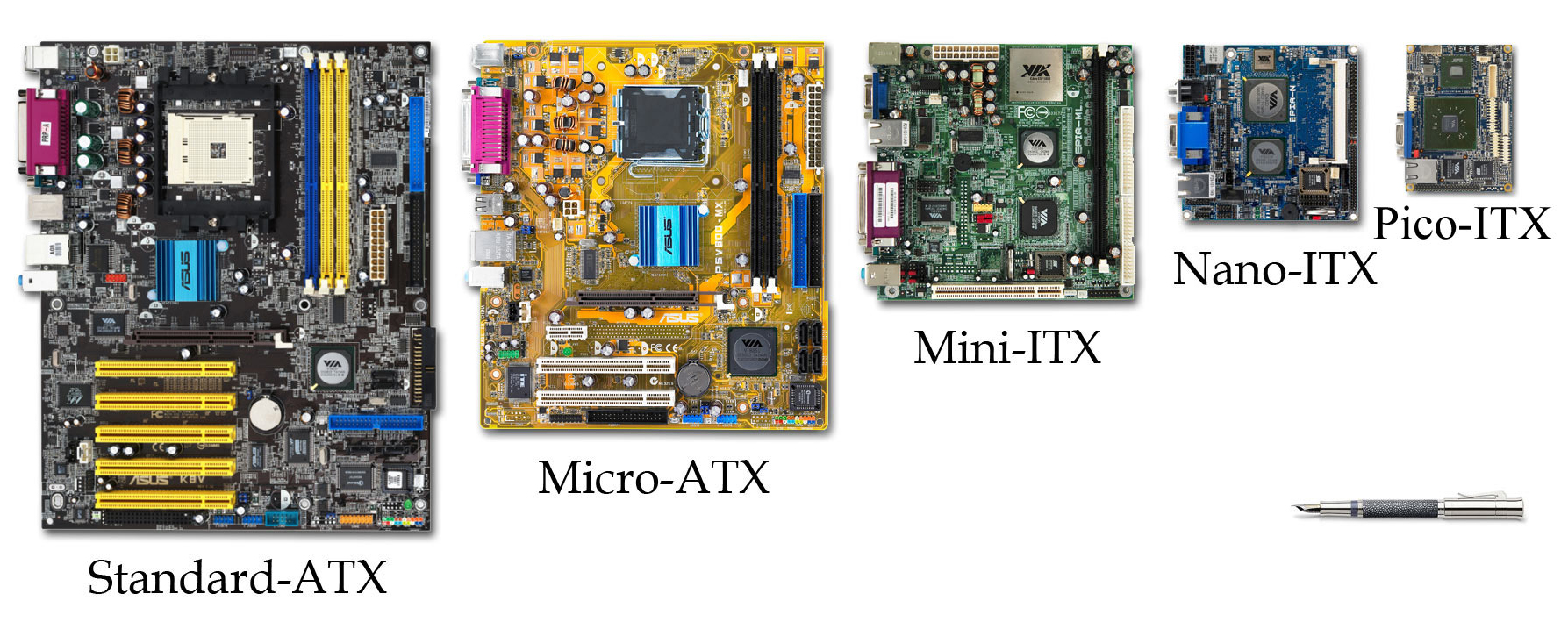
Motherboard form factor comparison, as of 2007 (pen for scale)

== History ==
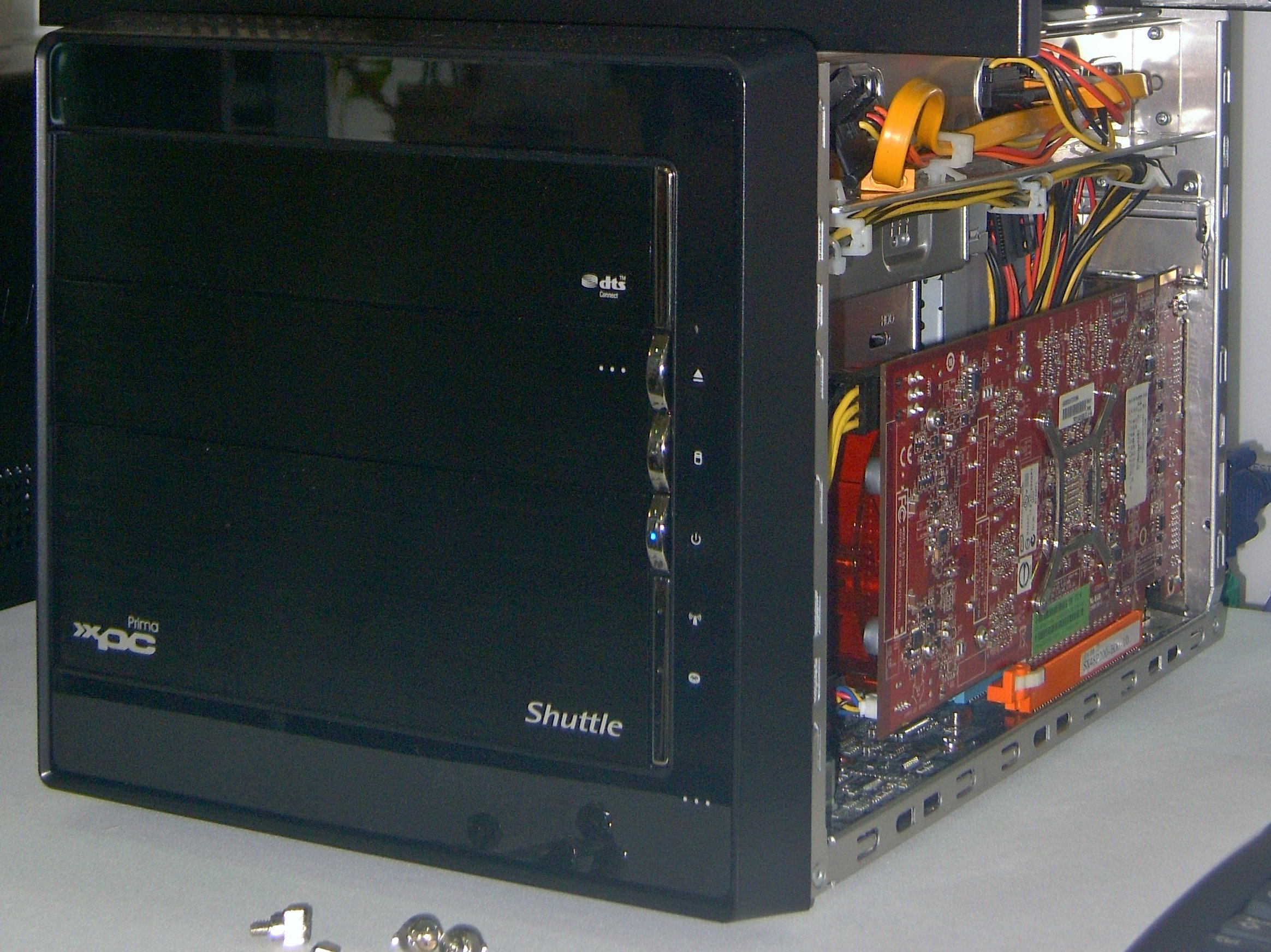
An early example of a shuttle-size case (Shuttle SP35 Pro)

The initialism SFF originally stood for "Shuttle Form Factor," describing shoebox-sized personal computers with two expansion slots. The meaning of SFF evolved to include other, similar PC designs from brands such as AOpen and First International Computer, with the word "Small" replacing the word "Shuttle".

The term SFF is used in contrast with terms for larger systems such as "mini-towers" and "desktops."

== Features ==
Small form factor computers are generally designed to support the same features as modern desktop computers, but in a smaller space. Most accept standard x86 microprocessors, standard dual in-line memory modules (DIMMs), standard 8.9 cm (3.5 in) hard disks, and standard 13.3 cm (5.2 in) optical drives.

However, the small size of SFF cases may limit expansion options; many commercial offerings provide only one 8.9 cm (3.5 in) drive bay and one or two 13.3 cm (5.2 in) external bays. Standard central processing unit (CPU) heatsinks do not always fit inside an SFF computer, so some manufacturers provide custom cooling systems. Though limited to one or two expansion cards, a few have the space for 3/4-length cards such as the GeForce GTX-295. Most SFF computers use highly integrated motherboards containing many on-board peripherals, reducing the need for expansion cards. By 2020, many SFF PC cases no longer included any expansion bays larger than 2.5 inches (large enough to accommodate SATA SSDs), due to the declining popularity of optical disc drives and 3.5-inch hard drives in the consumer space.

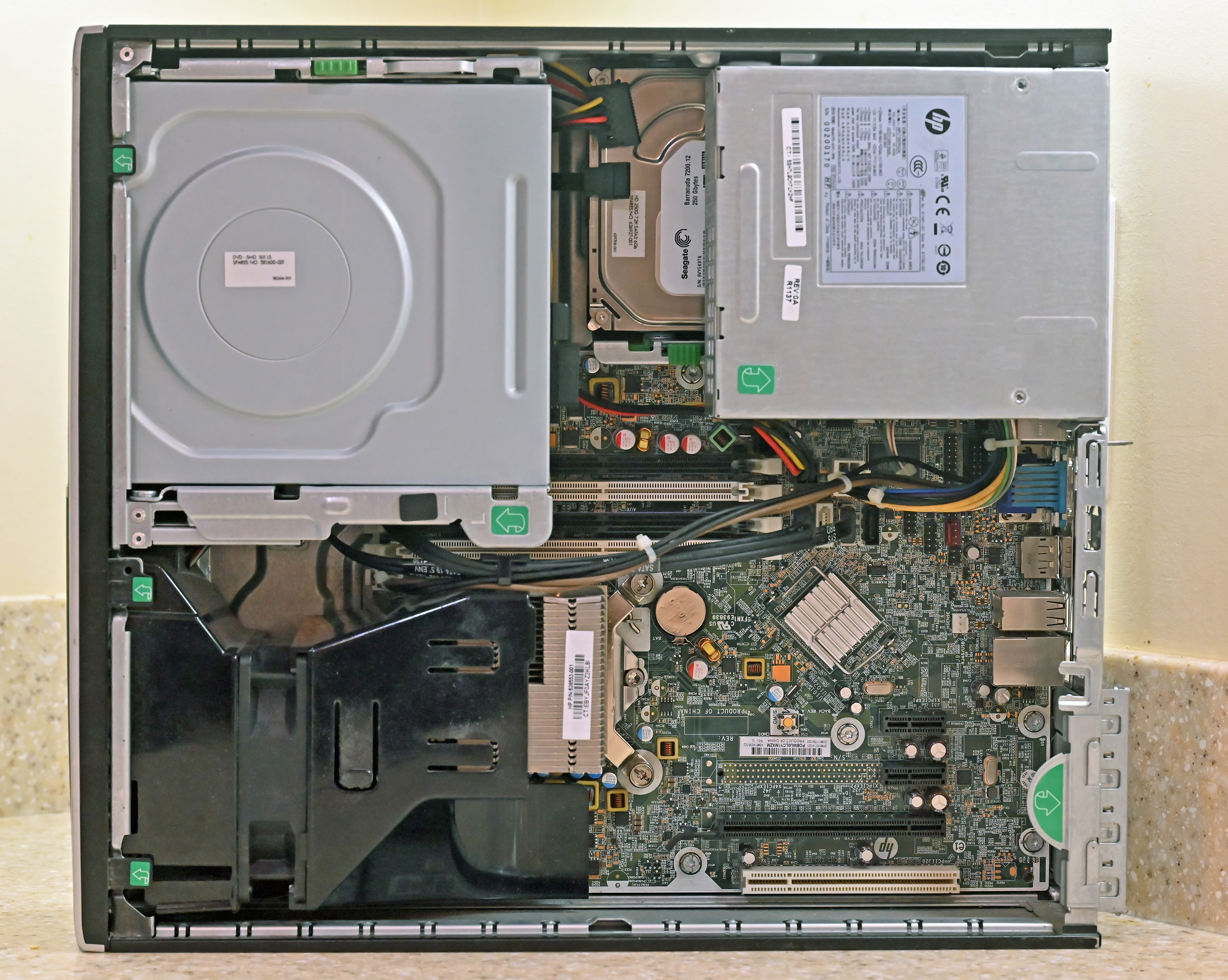
Inside an HP SFF desktop computer

== Enthusiast community and crowdfunding ==
Crowdfunding and availability of rapid prototyping tools has enabled the production of several mini-ITX cases focusing on efficient organization of commercial computer components into small volumes including the Ncase M1, Ghost S1, DAN A4-SFX, and Thor Zone MJOLNIR. Communities of enthusiasts and reviewers develop and promote enhanced SFF assembly, maintenance, and performance criteria. 3D printing and laser cutting have enabled customization and one-unit production by both manufacturers like Lazer3D and individual users with access to the relevant equipment.

== Types ==
The many different types of SFFs are categorized loosely by their shape and size. The types below are available as of 2013.

=== Cubic (shoebox) ===
Many SFF computers have a cubic shape. Smaller models are typically sold as barebone computers, including a case, motherboard, and power supply designed to fit together. The motherboard lies flat against the base of the case. Upgrade options may be limited by the non-standard motherboards, cramped interior space, and power and airflow concerns. The Power Mac G4 Cube, released in 2000, and the Shuttle XPC are good examples of this design. Micro-Star International (MSI) and Asus produce similar designs. The Xi3 Modular Computer is an example of a cube computer with a little more upgrade possibilities.

Shuttle has adapted several of its XPC models (some 5-series and most later) to alternately accept mini-ITX motherboards. The base of the XPC is provided with mounting points which accommodate both "Shuttle form factor" (ShFF) and mini-ITX motherboards. In order to accommodate mini-ITX motherboards, two of the ShFF mounting points are simply relocated (the remaining mini-ITX mounting points are in common with the remaining ShFF mounting points). A "standard" ShFF motherboard is 20.6 cm (8.1 in) wide by 27.3 cm (10.7 in) deep, with the I/O shield and the two PCI slots being located in common with mini-ITX motherboards. Most ShFF systems utilize Shuttle's proprietary heat pipe (liquid cooling) system, "Integrated Cooling Engine" (ICE), for the processor, although several also feature heat pipe cooling for the voltage regulator and/or the chip set (Northbridge). When an ShFF system is upgraded to a mini-ITX motherboard, an Intel or compatible processor fan must replace the ICE cooler. The ShFF's ICE computer fan is so designed that it may be repurposed as a case fan when the case is upgraded to mini-ITX use. When so upgraded, the repurposed fan would be connected to the motherboard's case fan connector (3-pin) while the new CPU fan would be connected to the motherboard's CPU fan connector (4-pin).

AOpen produced a stackable S120 case, allowing the user to stack up to four components vertically or horizontally. These layers can be for add-on cards, optical drives, and hard drives, using either internal power supplies or external AC adapter power sources. After the S120, AOpen made more small form factor cases for systems with Micro ATX and Mini-ITX.

=== Sandwich ===
Sandwich case

Right side, showing the power supply and CPU cooler

Left side, showing the graphics card

The graphics card is placed behind the motherboard and PSU, connecting to it via a PCI Express x16 extension cable. This design is popular with SFF enthusiasts as it packs high-performance hardware into a small space while providing adequate cooling. Water cooling radiators may be added on to the top, bottom or sides to further increase cooling capacity. An electrically insulating sheet, such as thermoplastic polyurethane, may be placed between the motherboard/PSU and graphics card to implement separate airflow zones, isolating heat sources from each other to improve cooling.

=== Console ===
Resembling a gaming console (such as Xbox One or PlayStation 4), the graphics card is placed directly above or below the motherboard and PSU. The graphics card is connected to motherboard with a PCIe x16 extension cable. This form factor is popular for those with a lack of desk or floor space as the footprint is small when placed vertically. It may also fit nicely into a TV cabinet/shelf and act as a cheaper, faster, upgradable alternative to gaming consoles. The graphics card may be sectioned off internally as to isolate it from the heat produced by the CPU.

=== Nettop ===
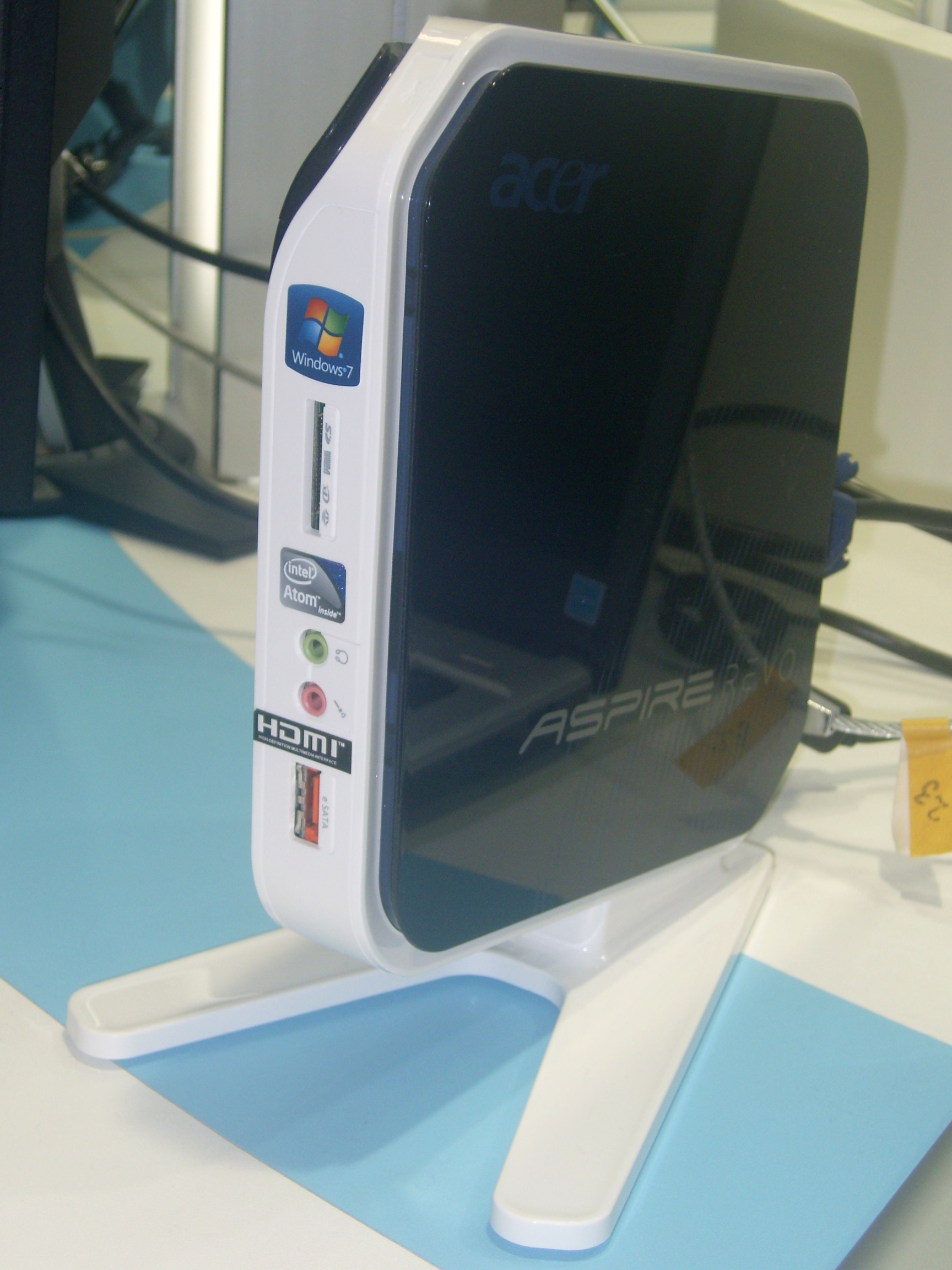
Acer Aspire Revo (2009)

Until 2005, SFF cases were usually sold as barebones units (case, power supply, and motherboard) to system integrators and home-based builders. In 2005, Apple Inc. introduced its Mac Mini (volume of 1.4 L, excluding external AC adapter). Later in the same year, the first AOpen mini PC MP915 (renamed to XC mini in 2007 since "mini PC" could not be registered as a trademark), was announced. The size of the XC mini series PC—16.5(W) × 5.0(H) × 16.5(D) cm—makes it one of the smallest desktop PC systems (1.3L volume). It was criticized for looking like the Apple Mac Mini but Apple did not act on this issue. In February 2007, AOpen redesigned the case of the mini PC MP945 series.

Since 2006, major original equipment manufacturer (OEM) PC brands such as Hewlett-Packard (HP) and Dell have begun to sell fully assembled SFF systems. These are often described as bookshelf units since they resemble a miniature tower case small enough to fit on a bookshelf. The HP Slimline series and Dell Dimension C521 (volume 1.65 L) are good examples of this trend. The Maxdata Favorite 300XS is another mini computer. The HP Slimline uses a non-standard motherboard that is very similar in size to Mini-ITX.

In addition to its industrial use, the extremely small Mini-ITX motherboard form factor has also been incorporated into SFF computers. These are often extremely compact, incorporating low-power components such as the VIA C3 processors. The Travla C134 is an example of this design. At 17.8 cm × 25.4 cm × 5.1 cm (7.0 in × 10.0 in × 2.0 in) the Travla C134 is somewhat larger than the Mac mini which is 16.5 cm × 16.5 cm × 5.1 cm (6.5 in × 6.5 in × 2.0 in) and barely bigger than a standard 13.3 cm (5.2 in) optical drive.

Starting in 2007, several other companies released other very small computers that besides a small size, focus on a low price, and high power efficiency (typically 10 W or below in use). These include the Zonbu, fit-PC, Linutop, and A9home. With the release of Intel Atom CPU, AOpen also made Nettop systems: the uBox series with model LE200 and LE210. The uBox series equips a dual-core Intel Atom 270/330 processor, single-channel DDR-II 533/667 memory, Intel 945GC+ICH7 chipset, three SATA connectors and 5.1-channel high-definition audio output.

Apple's 2024 Mac mini with the M4 system-on-a-chip (SoC) features a significantly smaller design than earlier models, with a 5x5-inch form factor often described as slightly larger than an Apple TV 4K.

=== Home theatre boxes ===
Essentially a bookshelf-style case lying on its side, a miniature HTPC replicates the look of other smaller-than-rack-sized home theatre components such as a digital video recorder (DVR) or mini audio receiver. The front panel interface is emphasized, with the optical disc drive rotated relative to the case in order to maintain horizontal mounting, and more motherboard port connectors (such as for USB) are routed to the front panel, they normally are as powerful as PC desktops.

=== Computer-on-module ===
A computer-on-module (COM) is a complete computer built on a single circuit board. They are often used as embedded systems due to their small physical size and low power consumption.

=== Ultra-small form factor ===
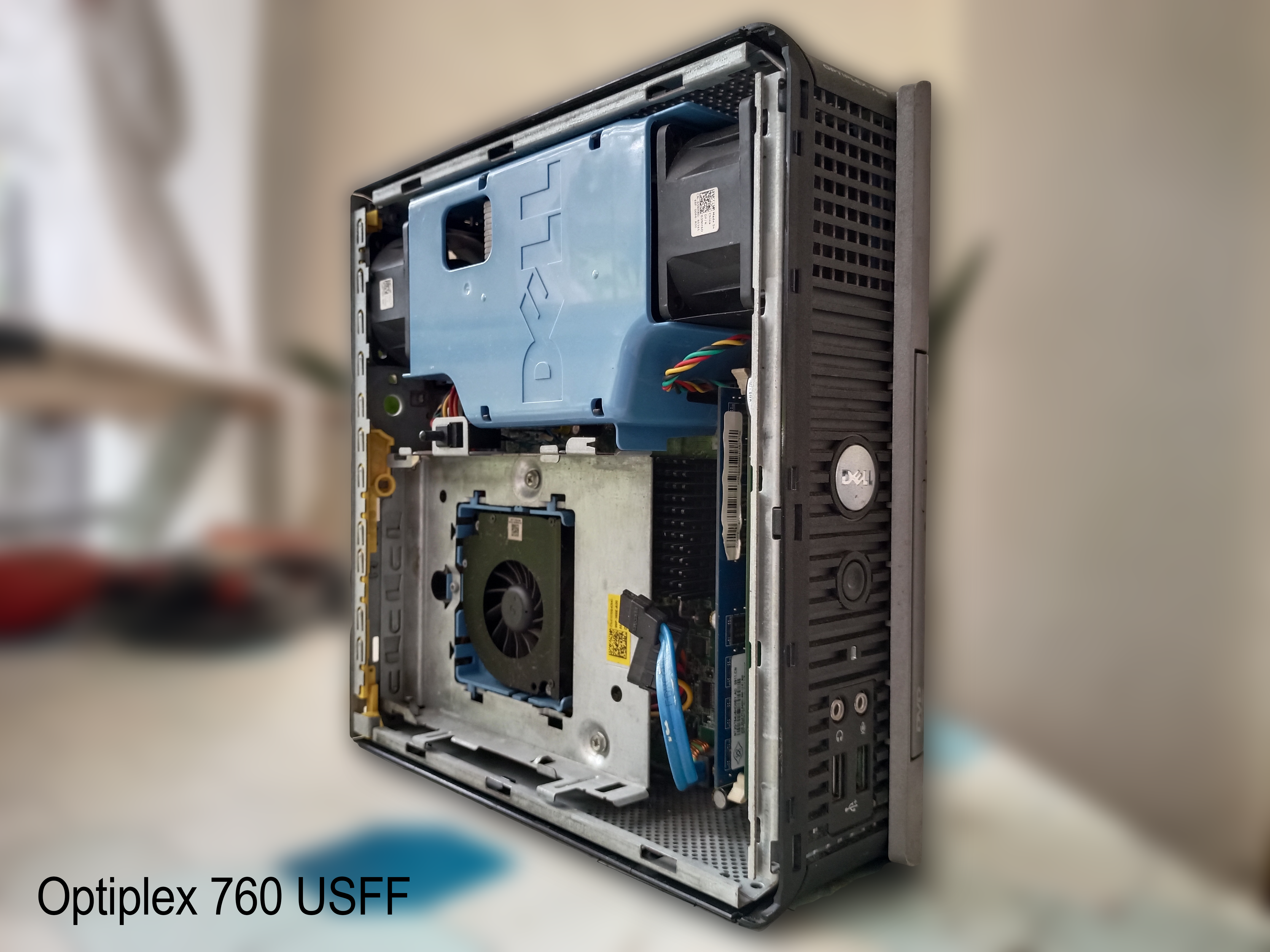
Internals of a USFF Dell Optiplex 760

Each model of Dell's OptiPlex line of computers typically includes an ultra-small form factor (USFF) chassis option. In the Core 2 era, these machines used 8.9 cm (3.5 in) desktop hard drives and external power supplies, such as the OptiPlex 760, 745 and 755. More recent units use 6.4 cm (2.5 in) laptop hard drives and have integrated power supplies, such as the OptiPlex 990 USFF. Some USFF models also use SO-DIMM memory, typically associated with laptops, despite being paired with desktop-class processors. The compact size comes at the cost of restricted expandability, as USFF models have no PCI or PCIe slots and may have limited CPU, storage and memory options.

==== Micro form factor ====
Starting from Series 5, USFF was replaced with micro form factor (MFF), an even smaller size option that uses external power supplies and does not have optical drives:

- Height: 18.2 cm (7.2 in)
- Depth: 17.8 cm (7.0 in)
- Width: 3.6 cm (1.4 in)

=== Ultra-compact form factor ===
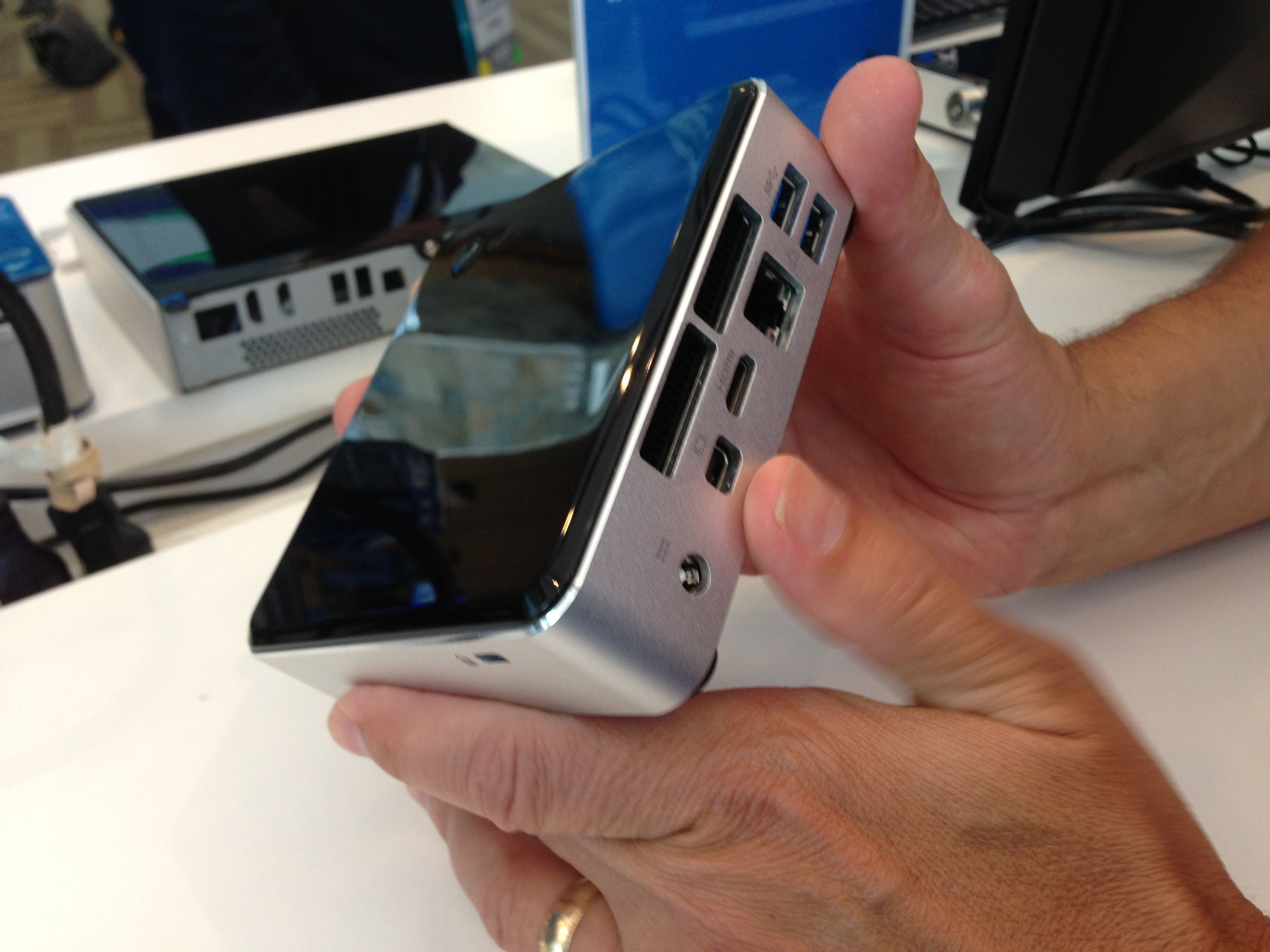
An Intel NUC (2013)

Understood as comprising nano-ITX (12 cm × 12 cm (4.7 in × 4.7 in)) and pico-ITX (10 cm × 7.2 cm (3.9 in × 2.8 in)) boards, the format was championed by VIA Technologies. Intel now describes its own Next Unit of Computing (NUC) products (10.2 cm × 10.2 cm (4.0 in × 4.0 in)) as UCFF.

== See also ==
- Case modding
- Mini-ITX
- Nettop
- PC-on-a-stick
- Business SFF-class nettops: Dell OptiPlex, Fujitsu Esprimo, Lenovo ThinkCentre, HP ProDesk and EliteDesk
- Single-board microcontroller
  - List of Arduino boards and compatible systems
- Small Form Factor Committee
- Small Form Factor Special Interest Group (SFF-SIG)
- Low-profile video card
