= Pico-ITX =

Small computer motherboard form factor

In computer design, Pico-ITX is a PC motherboard form factor announced by VIA Technologies in January 2007 and demonstrated later the same year at CeBIT. The formfactor was transferred over to SFF-SIG in 2008. The Pico-ITX form factor specifications call for the board to be 10 × 7.2 cm (3.9 × 2.8 in), which is half the area of Nano-ITX.

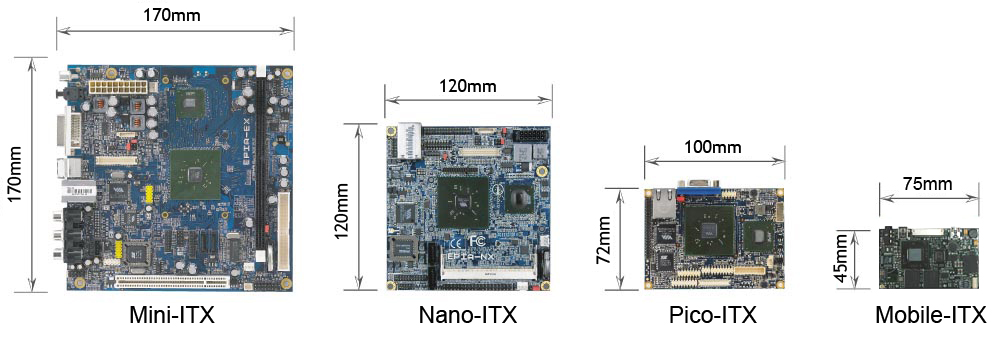
ITX motherboard form factor comparison

== EPIA PX ==
The EPIA PX10000G, Rev B.

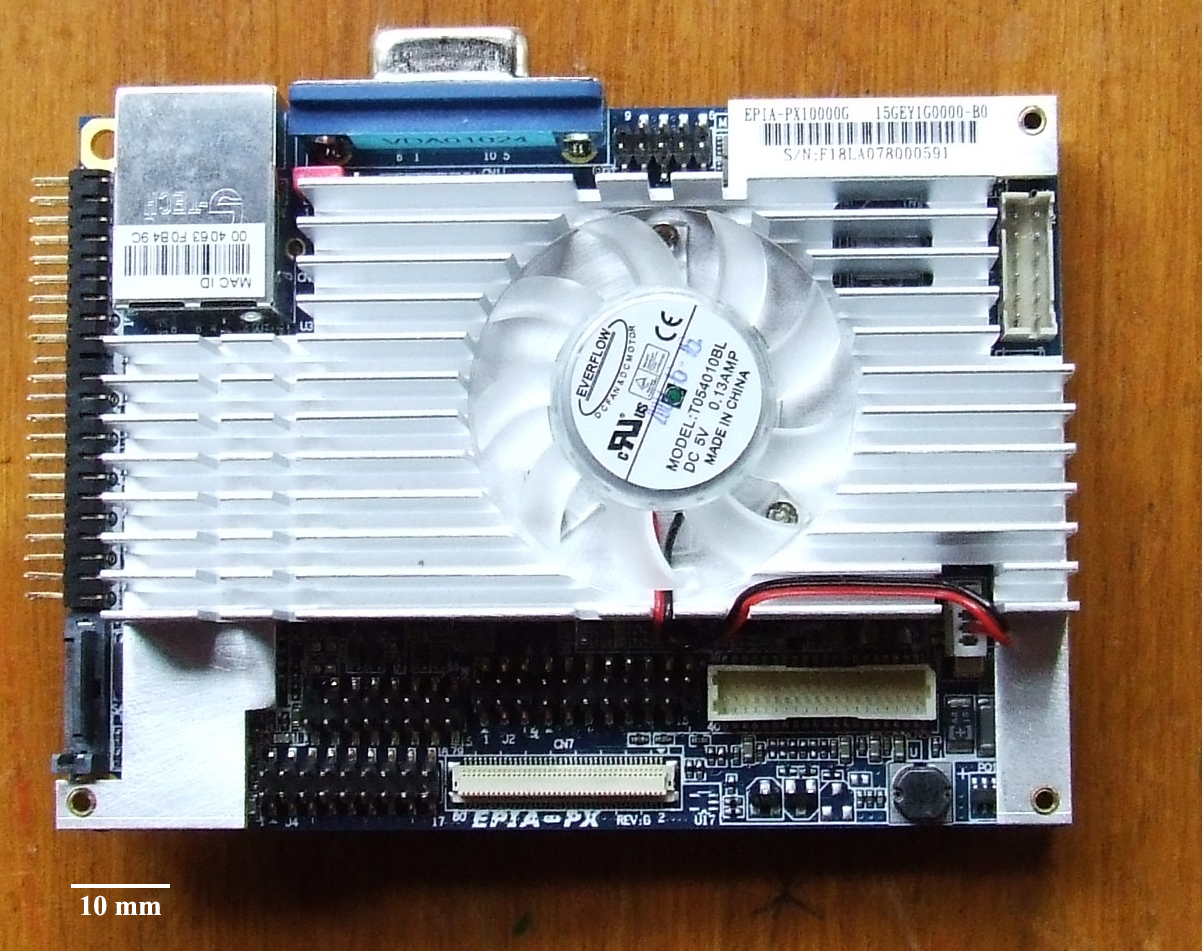
Top view

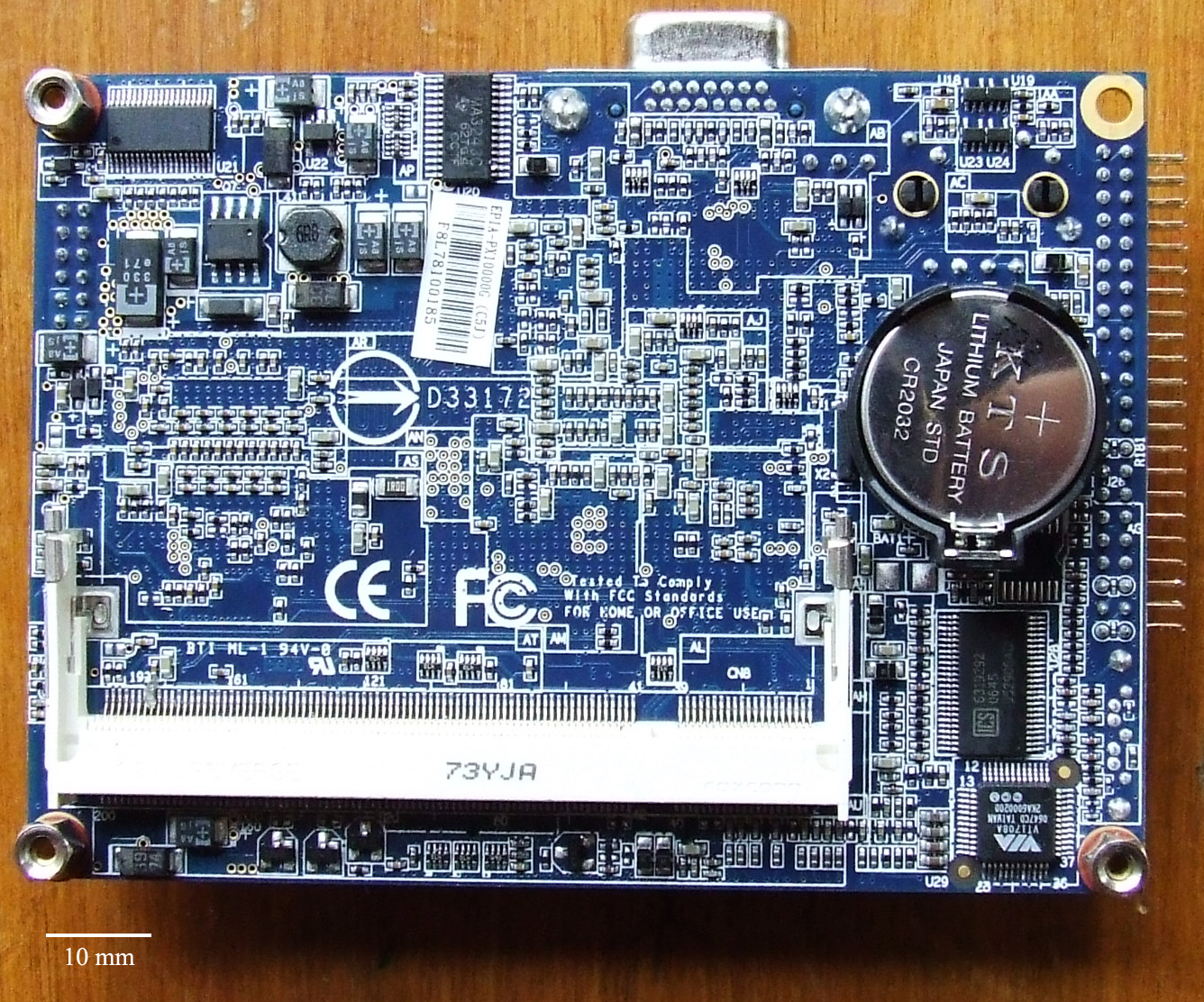
Bottom view

=== PX10000G ===
The first motherboard produced in this form factor is called EPIA PX10000G. It is 10 × 7.2 cm (3.9 × 2.8 in) and the printed circuit board is 10 layers deep. The operating temperature range is from 0 to about 50 °C (32 to about 122 °F). The operating humidity level (relative and non-condensing) can be from 0% to about 95%. It uses a 1 GHz VIA C7-M processor, a VIA VX700 chip set, and is RoHS compliant.

It has onboard VGA video, VIA VT6106S 10/100 8P8C Ethernet, UDMA 33/66/100/133 44-pin ATA (1x), and SATA (1x) I/O. DVI and LVDS video-out, USB 2.0, COM, PS/2 Mouse & Keyboard, and HD 5.1 channel audio (supplied by a VIA VT1708A chip) are supported through the usage of I/O pin headers and add-on modules/daughter cards.

It has been demonstrated running Microsoft Windows XP and Windows Vista. older versions of major Linux distributions, including Fedora Core 6 and Ubuntu 7.10, will also run on it. It is available as a single board, as well as part of a barebones package, the Artigo, a small form factor complete computer.

=== PX5000 ===
This model is similar to the PX10000G, but uses the 500 MHz VIA Eden ULV CPU.

There are two versions of this model, the PX5000G, which has a fan-assisted heatsink, and the PX5000EG, which has a fanless heatsink.

=== Add-on modules ===
(Note: Either the VIA PX-O add-on module or 4 USB 2.0 I/O are supplied in retail packages.) The VIA PX-O daughtercard supplies access to:

- 1 RCA-out for S/PDIF usage
- 4 USB 2.0 ports
- 1 3.5mm Mic-in, 1 3.5mm line-out, 1 3.5mm line-in
- 1 buzzer/speaker
- 1 CN9 connector (function TBC)
- 1 CN10 connector (function TBC).

The VIA VT1625M daughtercard supplies access to:

- 1 external TV-out
- 1 video capture port.

The Serener PXFPIO (also labeled under VIA PX-DIO) is 109mm × 22mm in size and connects via a 120mm ribbon cable through a daughter card. This addon may require modification to the heatsink due to the size of the daughter card. It supplies access to:

- power & reset switches
- 3.5mm audio in/out
- S/PDIF-in
- power & HDD activity LEDs
- 4 USB 2.0 ports

The VIA PX-TC daughter card, compatible with the PX10000G only, is designed to enhance the multimedia capture and output. It supplies access to:

- 1 S-Video port
- 1 video-in port
- 1 YPbPr port
- 1 S/PDIF-out

== EPIA-P700 ==
The second motherboard series in this form factor, the P700 series improves upon the PX10000G series by offering Gigabit Ethernet (Using the VIA VT6122 chipset) or a 10/100 Ethernet adapter (VIA VT6107) as a manufacturing option, integrating the power adapter (allowing for direct +12V DC-In & enabling it to directly power SATA), and making the Ethernet & VGA ports optional via the P700-A daughter card.

Expanded functionality is offered via the following pin I/O:

- 1 LAN
- 1 VGA/DVI
- 1 COM Port
- 1 Audio pin connector for Line-out, Line-in, MIC-in
- 1 Front panel
- 4 USB 2.0
- 1 PS2 mouse/keyboard
- 1 LVDS
- 1 LPC/SM Bus/GPIO (Unusable due to VIA not releasing a GPIO driver)

The EPIA-P700-10L has a 1 GHz VIA C7 CPU.

The EPIA-P700-05LE has a 500 MHz VIA Eden ULV CPU and has a passive heatsink.

=== Add-on modules ===
The P700 comes retail with the P700-A & P700-B daughter cards.

The P700-A supplies:

- Gigabit Ethernet
- 1 VGA port
- 1 COM port
- DVI port via I/O cable

The P700-B supplies:

- 4 USB 2.0 ports
- 1 Buzzer
- 1 Line-out, 1 Line-in, 1 MIC-in (3.5 mm)

== Intel-based products ==
Even though the form factor was introduced by VIA Technologies, there are also boards available based on Intel processors. Some have the CPU and the chipset directly on the Pico-ITX board.

== ARM-based products ==
Pico-ITX boards are also available with ARM architecture. In this field DH electronics uses the standardized DHCOM Computer On Modules with several ARM based modules.

== Pico-ITXe ==
The Pico-ITXe specification adds onto the Pico-ITX form factor by taking the EPIA-P700 and upgrading the chipset to a VX800, doubling the maximum RAM to 2 GB, allowing for 667/533 SO-DIMM RAM, upgrading the GPU to VIA's Chrome9 HC3, and adding support for SUMIT. Another notable addition is the expansion from 10 to 12 layers thickness.

== See also ==
- EPIA
- Mini-ITX
- Mobile-ITX
- Ultra-Mobile PC
