= CoreExpress =

CoreExpress modules are complete computer-on-module (COM) highly integrated, compact computers that can be used in an embedded computer board design, much like an integrated circuit component. COMs integrate CPU, memory, graphics, and BIOS, and common I/O interfaces. The interfaces are modern, using only digital buses such as PCI Express, Serial ATA, Ethernet, USB, and HD audio (Intel High Definition Audio). All signals are accessible on a high-density, high-speed, 220-pin connector. Although most implementations use Intel processors, the specification is open for different CPU modules.

CoreExpress modules are mounted on a custom carrier board, containing the peripherals required for the specific application. In this way, small but highly specialized computer systems can be built.

The CoreExpress form factor was originally developed by LiPPERT Embedded Computers and standardized by the Small Form Factor Special Interest Group (SFF-SIG) in March 2010. It was competing with other standards like COM Express or Qseven. Initially adopted by the German LiPPERT and the Swiss company DIGITAL-LOGIC (which has meanwhile been bought by Kontron), it was later backed up by more than eight vendors including Syslogic.

CoreExpress dimensions

== Size and mechanics ==
The specification defines a board size of 58 mm × 65 mm, slightly smaller than a credit card and small enough to allow a carrier board in standard PC/104-Plus format.

The module can be embedded into a heat spreader, which distributes the component-generated heat onto a larger surface area. In low power applications, this distribution may be enough for complete thermal dissipation.

In higher power applications, the heat spreader presents a thermal interface for mating to additional heat dissipating components such as finned heat sinks. Heat spreaders are simpler and more rugged to connect to than the heat generating components underneath. This simplifies mechanical design for the system builder, but can be less efficient than a complete purpose-built thermal solution.

In a complete system, heat spreaders can be part of the electromagnetic interference containment design.

== Specification ==
The specification is hosted by the SFF-SIG and is available on their website. Revision 2.1 was released on 23 February 2010.

== See also ==
- Embedded System Module
- Computer-on-module
- Computer form factor
- Embedded system
