= Epia =

Epia may refer to:

- Aipeia, a town in Messenia, Greece
- EPIA, a PC platform from VIA Technologies
- European Photovoltaic Industry Association
- Epia (moth)
- Eurasian Point Of Inaccessibility, the furthest away point from any ocean.
