= Small Form Factor Special Interest Group =

Standards body specializing in small electronic devices

- Founded: September 2007
- Type: Professional Organization
- Purpose: Standards for small, low power computers, building blocks, and accessories
- Method: Industry Standards, Conferences, Publications
- Members: 16
- Key people: Colin McCracken (president)

The Small Form Factor Special Interest Group (SFF-SIG, pronounced ess-eff-eff-sig) is an international non-profit standards body focused on modular computer hardware technologies used in embedded and small form factor computers and controllers. Members are mainly computer board and component manufacturers. The group was founded in 2007 and had a web site until early 2020.

== History ==
SFF-SIG generally targets low power components and processors from VIA Technologies and Intel including the Nano and Atom processors, although products for RISC processors were discussed in some working groups. VIA, WinSystems, and Octagon Systems were founding members of SFF-SIG. It was created in 2007. A logo and web site debuted in April 2008.

SFF-SIG creates, promotes, and maintains embedded computer standards for form factors and computer buses. Examples include the governing documents and trademarks for CoreExpress, Pico-ITX, Express104, and SUMIT. Members use the specifications to build specialized embedded computers used in both commercial and rugged environments where applications insist on reliable control and data acquisition, for example. Primarily focused on hardware, SFF-SIG defined new single-board computer (SBC) and computer-on-module (COM) form factors. SFF-SIG standardizes expansion connectors to create the building blocks required by system manufacturers. Each specification is a free open standard by ITU-T definition.

Specifications often use pre-existing interface buses and interconnects such as PCI Express, USB 2.0, ExpressCard, Low Pin Count (LPC) Bus, SPI / uWire, and I2C / SMBus, with adaptations for modular and extensible usage. Some standards preserve the Industry Standard Architecture (ISA) bus and legacy peripherals.

== See also ==
- Small Form Factor Committee
