= VIA CoreFusion =

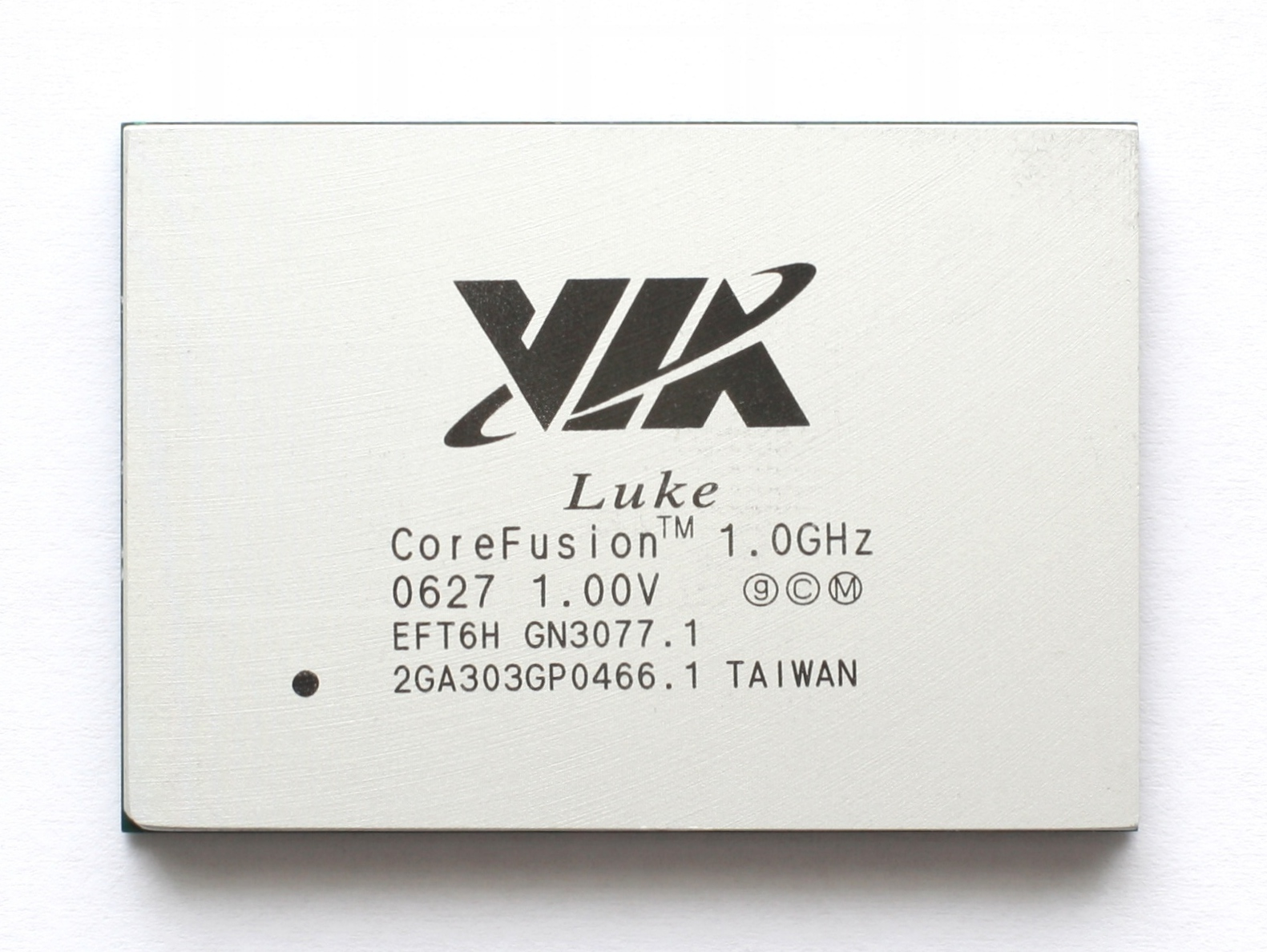
VIA Luke.

VIA CoreFusion is a line of low power x86 processors manufactured by VIA starting in 2003. The Corefusion integrates the Northbridge, graphics processing unit and a V-Link Interface (Luke and John only.)

The Corefusion platform is available in four varieties: Mark, Luke, Luke-Lite and John.

== Mark ==
The Corefusion Mark was released on March 12, 2003. The processor core is based on the VIA C3 'Nehemiah', and includes the VIA ProSavage CLE266 Northbridge and the S3 Graphics ProSavage4 graphics processing unit. It supports 133 MHz SDRAM

Specifications (C3 Core)

- L1-Cache: 64 + 64 kB (Data + Instructions)
- L2-Cache: 64 kB
- MMX, 3DNow!, SSE
- Security Features: RNG, AES
- BGA686
- Front side bus: 133 MHz
- VCore: 0.9-1.0 V
- Power consumption: 6-10 W
- First release: March 12, 2003
- Clockrate:
  - Mark: 533-1000 MHz

== Luke and Luke-Lite ==
The Corefusion Luke was released on 8 March 2005. The processor core is based on the VIA Eden-N, and includes the VIA CN400 Northbridge and the S3 Graphics Unichrome Pro graphics processing unit. It supports up to 400 MHz DDR SDRAM.

The Corefusion Luke-Lite is nearly identical to the Luke, with the only difference being the integrated Northbridge is replaced with a VIA CN333. This limits the maximum memory speed to 333 MHz (versus the 400 MHz on the Luke.)

Specifications (Eden-N Core)

- L1-Cache: 64 + 64 kB (data + instructions)
- L2-Cache: 64 kB
- MMX, 3DNow!, SSE
- Security Features: RNG, AES
- BGA841
- Front side bus: 133 MHz
- VCore: 0.9-1.0 V
- Power consumption: 6-10 W
- First release: Mar 8, 2005
- Clockrate:
  - Luke: 533-1000 MHz
  - Luke-Lite: 533-1000 MHz

== John ==
Little is known about the Corefusion John, other than a VIA roadmap PDF from 2005 found here. It was apparently planned as a successor to the Luke, and supposed planned features were to include DDR2 support, hardware WMV9 decoding and HD audio support. It is unknown if this part was ever released, but it likely would have used some variant of a VIA C7 core (since VIA lost licenses required to produce the C3 series.)

== See also ==
- AMD Accelerated Processing Unit
- Geode (processor)
- VIA C3
- VIA C7
