= WinSystems =

- Founded: 1982; 44 years ago
- Founder: Jerry Winfield
- Headquarters: Grand Prairie, Texas, USA
- Website: winsystems.com

WinSystems is an employee owned embedded systems manufacturer specializing in ruggedized, highly reliable industrial computer systems. The company was founded by Jerry Winfield in 1982 and is headquartered in Grand Prairie, Texas.

== History ==
Founded in 1982 (as WinTech), WinSystems manufactures and distributes embedded computers for use in industrial applications. Products include embedded x86-compatible single-board computers, COM Modules, COM carrier boards, touch panel PCs, analog boards, digital input/output (I/O) boards, industrial CompactFlash and many other items that are used in industrial embedded systems. On September 19, 2007 - Jerry Winfield, President of WINSYSTEMS, announced the establishment of an Employee Stock Ownership Plan (ESOP) making the employees stockholders.(Employee ownership) This corporate structure is intended to provide long-term operational stability and ensure the continued availability of products for customers. This is very important for industrial OEMs that rely on embedded PC technology for ongoing and future applications.

== Products ==
The majority of WinSystems manufacturing is done in Grand Prairie Texas.

=== PC/104 ===
The PC/104 standard defines a compact / modular form-factor bus for embedding ISA Bus system functions within embedded microcomputer applications. The modules' small size (3.6" x 3.8") and low power requirements make them ideally suited to embedded control applications.

=== PC/104-Plus ===
The PC/104-Plus defines additional PCI functionality that is usually paired with a PC/104 connector to give an embedded system complete ISA and PCI expansion. Like PC/104 modules', PC/104-PLUS modules are small (3.6" x 3.8") and have low power requirements.

=== STD Bus ===
STD Bus is IEEE-961 standard. The STD Bus has a number of advantages over other bus architectures used in industrial applications such as PC/104 and Multibus. Its simple interface, smaller card size (4.5" x 6.5"); solid, nearly square peripheral cards, and strong card mounts, tolerate shock and vibrations making the STD Bus ideal for rugged industrial environments.

== COM Modules ==
COM technology has been around in various forms for decades and consists of a mezzanine approach with CPU, memory and basic I/O interfaces on a module that mounts to a single carrier board or a stack of boards to complete the I/O and system requirements. The approach allows the most complicated part of the design to be separated from the unique I/O requirements of different carrier board solutions. PC/104 is often considered one of the original COM module approaches. Not only does PC/104 provide an ecosystem of CPU and I/O vendors, many OEMs used the standardized bus and mounting to design unique carrier cards using off-the-shelf CPU modules available from multiple vendors. WINSYSTEMS currently offers industrial COM Express Type 10 Mini modules and supporting carrier cards, both of which are designed and manufactured in its Grand Prairie, Texas, USA facilities.

== Single board computers ==
WinSystems offers commercial off-the-shelf (COTS), modified COTS and custom-designed ARM and Embedded PCs engineered for rugged, industrial environments, extended operating temperature ranges, and long product life cycles of 10+ years.
