= EPIA =

Computer motherboard form factor

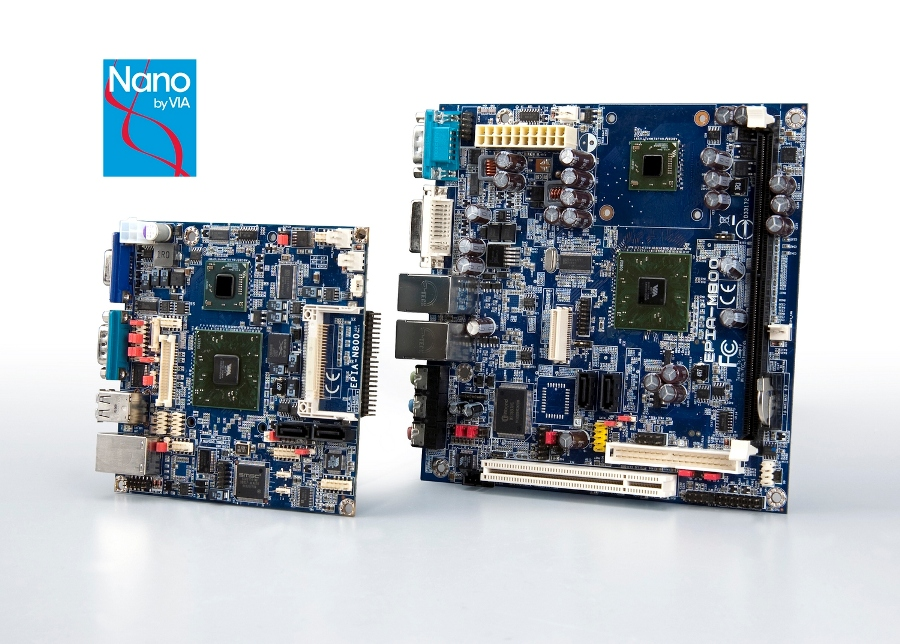
VIA EPIA-N800 (pico-ITX) and VIA EPIA-M800 (mini-ITX)

VIA EPIA (VIA Embedded Platform Innovative Architecture) is a series of mini-ITX, em-ITX, nano-ITX, pico-ITX and pico-ITXe motherboards with integrated VIA processors. They are small and consume less power than computers of comparable capabilities.

== Model codes ==
The VIA EPIA motherboards have the following designators:

Code	Definition
A	Configured without TV-out
E	Fanless configuration
G	RoHS-compliant
L	Configured with Gigabit LAN (where this is optional)
T	With TPM

=== Pico-ITX ===
==== EPIA PX ====
- Processor: 1× VIA C7 with 1000 MHz
- Chipset: VIA VX700 Unified Digital Media IGP chipset
- Main memory: 1 DDR2-533 SO-DIMM socket (max. 1024 MB)
- Miscellaneous:
  - 1× ATA
  - 1× Serial ATA
  - 1× LVDS / DVI connector
  - 7.1 HD audio

All connections apart from the VGA and network connection are only onboard for reasons of space.

=== Nano-ITX ===
==== EPIA N ====
- Processor: 1× Luke CoreFusion with 500, 800 or 1,000 MHz
- Chipset: Luke CoreFusion (integrated VIA CN400 Northbridge) + VIA VT8237R Southbridge
- Main memory: 1× DDR-SDRAM as SO-DIMM (PC3200, PC2700, PC2100 and PC1600)
- Miscellaneous:
  - 1× Mini PCI
  - 1× Serial ATA
  - 1× LVDS connector
  - 1× S-Video
  - 1× RCA (for S/PDIF or Composite)

==== EPIA NL ====
- Processor: 1× Luke CoreFusion with 500, 800 or 1,000 MHz
- Chipset: Luke CoreFusion (integrated VIA CN400 Northbridge) + VIA VT8237R Southbridge
- Main memory: 1× DDR-SDRAM as SO-DIMM (PC3200, PC2700, PC2100 and PC1600)
- Miscellaneous:
  - encryption unit
  - 1× Mini PCI
  - 1× Serial ATA
  - 1× LVDS connector

=== Mini-ITX ===
==== EPIA ====
- Processor: 1× VIA C3 (800 MHz) or 1× EDEN ESP (533 MHz)
- Chipset: VIA PLE133T Northbridge + VIA VT8231 Southbridge
- Main memory: 2× SDR-SDRAM (PC100 and PC133)
- Miscellaneous:
  - 1× S-Video
  - 1× RCA (for S/PDIF or Composite)

==== EPIA CL ====
- Processor: 1× VIA C3 (1000 MHz) or 1× EDEN ESP (600 MHz)
- Chipset: VIA CLE266 Northbridge + VIA VT8235 Southbridge
- Main memory: 1× DDR SDRAM (PC2100 and PC1600)
- Miscellaneous:
  - 2× LAN
  - 1× LVDS connector

==== EPIA CN ====
- Processor: 1× VIA C3 (1300 MHz or 1000 MHz)
- Chipset: VIA CN700 Northbridge + VIA VT8237R Southbridge
- VGA: VIA UniChromeTM Pro with MPEG-2 decoder
- Main memory: 1× DDR2-SDRAM, 533 MHz (up to 1 GB)
- Miscellaneous:
  - 2× Serial ATA
  - 1× S-Video
  - 1× RCA (for S/PDIF or Composite)
  - 1× LAN
  - 8× USB
  - 1× COM

==== EPIA M ====
- Processor: 1× VIA C3 (1000 MHz) or 1× EDEN ESP (600 MHz)
- Chipset: VIA CLE266 Northbridge + VIA VT8235 Southbridge
- Main memory: 1× DDR SDRAM (PC2100 and PC1600)
- Miscellaneous:
  - 1× FDD connector
  - LVDS connector
  - 1× S-Video
  - 1× RCA (for S/PDIF or Composite)

==== EPIA MII ====
- Processor: 1× VIA C3 (1200 or 1000 MHz) or 1× EDEN ESP (600 MHz)
- Chipset: VIA CLE266 Northbridge + VIA VT8235 Southbridge
- Main memory: 1× DDR SDRAM (PC2100 and PC1600)
- Miscellaneous:
  - 1× FDD connector
  - LVDS connector
  - 1× S-Video
  - 1× RCA (for S/PDIF or Composite)
  - CardBus / CompactFlash slot
  - 1× FireWire (IEEE 1394)

==== EPIA ML ====
- Processor: 1× VIA C3 (800 MHz) or 1× EDEN ESP (500 MHz)
- Chipset: VIA CLE266 Northbridge + VIA VT8235 Southbridge
- Main memory: 1× DDR SDRAM (PC2100 and PC1600)
- Miscellaneous: -

==== EPIA MS ====
- Processor: 1× VIA C3 (1200 MHz) or 1× EDEN ESP (1000 or 800 MHz)
- Chipset: VIA CLE266 Northbridge + VIA VT8237 Southbridge
- Main memory: 1× DDR SDRAM (PC2100 and PC1600)
- Miscellaneous:
  - CardBus / CompactFlash slot
  - Most of the connections are implemented as plug strips

==== EPIA PD ====
- Processor: 1× VIA C3 (1000 MHz) or 1× EDEN ESP (600 MHz)
- Chipset: VIA CLE266 Northbridge + VIA VT8235 Southbridge
- Main memory: 1× DDR-SDRAM (PC2100 and PC1600) max. 1 GB
- Miscellaneous:
  - 2× Local Area Network, 1x Via Rhine II + 1x Via Rhine III
  - 4× USB 2.0+ 2x USB optional
  - 1× COM external + 3× internal ports COM
  - 1× parallel
  - 1× 1x VIA/S3G CLE266 graphics onboard
  - 1× 1xPCI with extension card
  - 1× LVDS connector
  - 1× AC97 sound on board

==== EPIA SP ====
- Processor: 1× VIA C3 (1300 MHz) or 1× EDEN ESP (800 MHz)
- Chipset: VIA CN400 Northbridge + VIA VT8237 Southbridge
- Main memory: 1× DDR SDRAM (PC3200, PC2700, PC2100 and PC1600)
- Miscellaneous:
  - encryption unit
  - 2× Serial ATA
  - 1× FireWire IEEE 1394
  - 1× S-Video
  - 1× RCA (for S/PDIF or Composite)

==== EPIA TC ====
- Processor: 1× VIA C3 (1000 MHz) or 1× EDEN ESP (600 MHz)
- Chipset: VIA CLE266 Northbridge + VIA VT8235 Southbridge
- Main memory: 1× DDR-SDRAM as SO-DIMM (PC2100 and PC1600)
- Miscellaneous:
  - CardBus / CompactFlash slot
  - 1× LVDS connector
  - direct connection to 12 V DC

==== EPIA V ====
- Processor: 1× VIA C3 (800 MHz) or 1× EDEN ESP (533 MHz)
- Chipset: VIA PLE133T Northbridge + VIA VT8231 Southbridge
- Main memory: 2× SDR-SDRAM (PC100 and PC133)
- Miscellaneous: -

==== EPIA EX ====
- Processor: 1× VIA C7 with 1500 MHz or 1000 MHz
- Chipset: VIA CX700M2
- VGA: UniChromeTM Pro II 3D/2D with MPEG-2/4 and WMV9 decoder
- Main memory: 1× DDR2 533 (up to 1 Gb)

==== VT-310DP ====
- Processor: 2× EDEN ESP (1000 MHz or 800 MHz)
- Chipset: VIA CN400 Northbridge + VIA VT8237R Southbridge
- Main memory: 1× DDR SDRAM (PC3200, PC2700, PC2100 and PC1600)
- Miscellaneous:
  - encryption unit
  - 2× Serial ATA
  - 3× LAN
