= SUMIT =

Stackable Unified Module Interconnect Technology (SUMIT) is a connector between expansion buses independent of motherboard form factor. Boards featuring SUMIT connectors are usually used in "stacks" where one board sits on top of another. It was published by the Small Form Factor Special Interest Group.

== Details ==
Two identical connectors carry the signals specified by the standard. Commonly referred to as SUMIT A & SUMIT B, designers have the option of designing with either both SUMIT A and B, or just SUMIT A. The signals carried within each connector is as follows:

SUMIT A:

- One PCI-Express x1 lane
- Four USB 2.0
- ExpressCard
- LPC
- SPI/uWire
- SMBus/I^{2}C Bus

SUMIT B:

- One PCI-Express x1 lane
- One PCI-Express x4 or four more PCI-Express x1 lanes

As of August 2009, three board form factors used the SUMIT connectors for embedded applications: ISM or SUMIT-ISM [90mm × 96mm], Pico-ITXe [72mm × 100mm], and Pico-I/O [60mm × 72mm].

== See also ==
- VMEbus
- VPX
- CompactPCI
- PC/104
- Pico-ITXe
