= STD Bus =

Computer bus

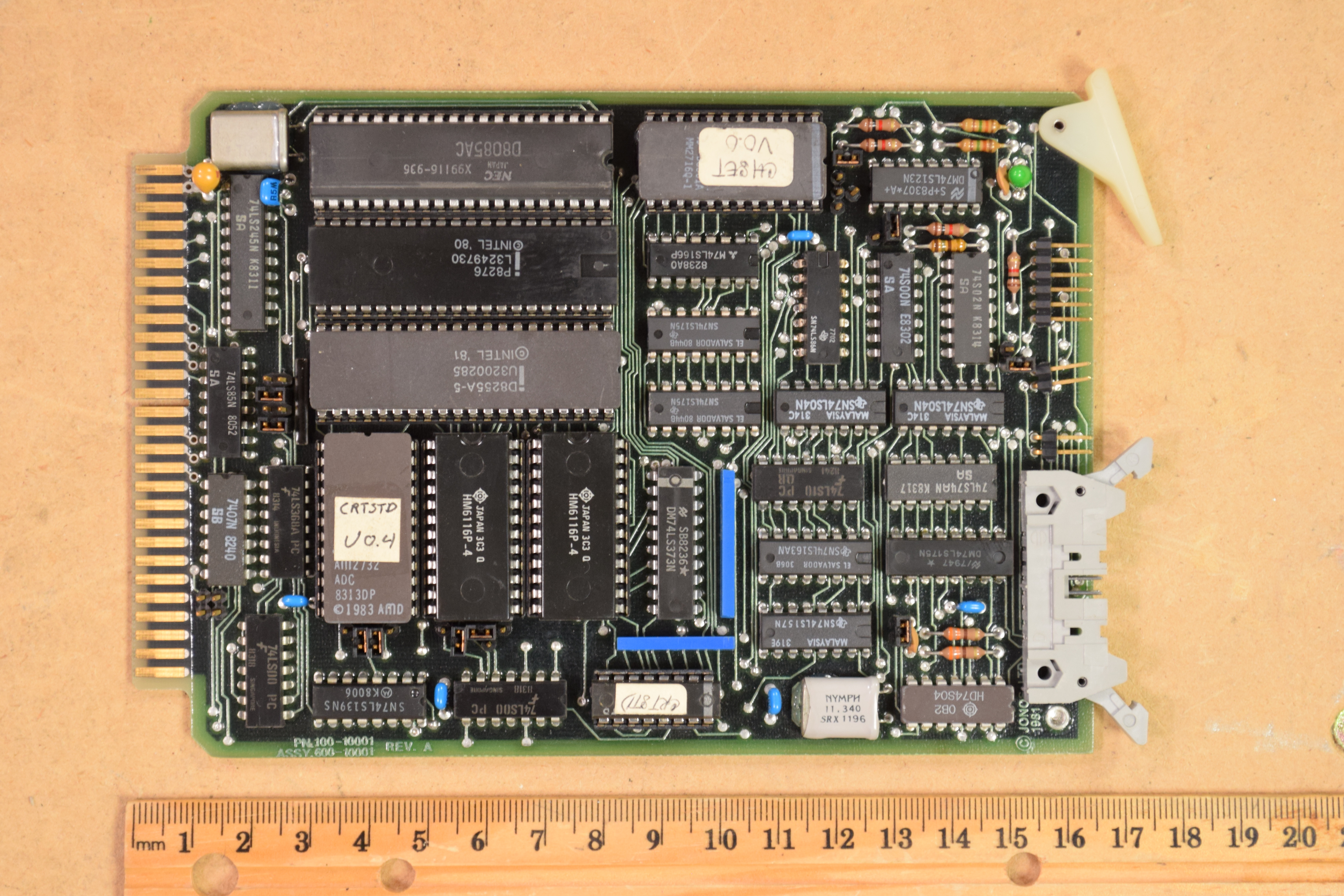
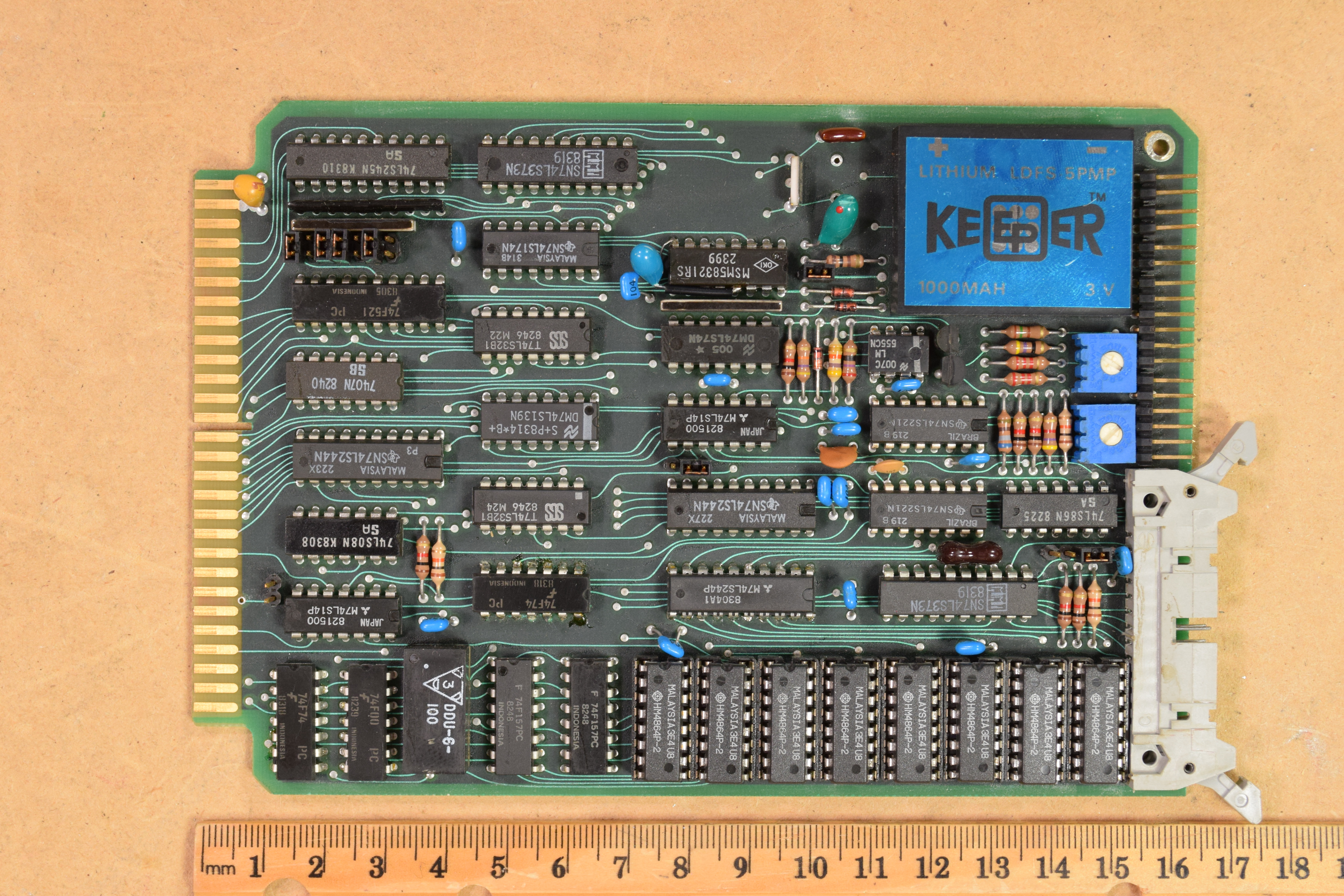
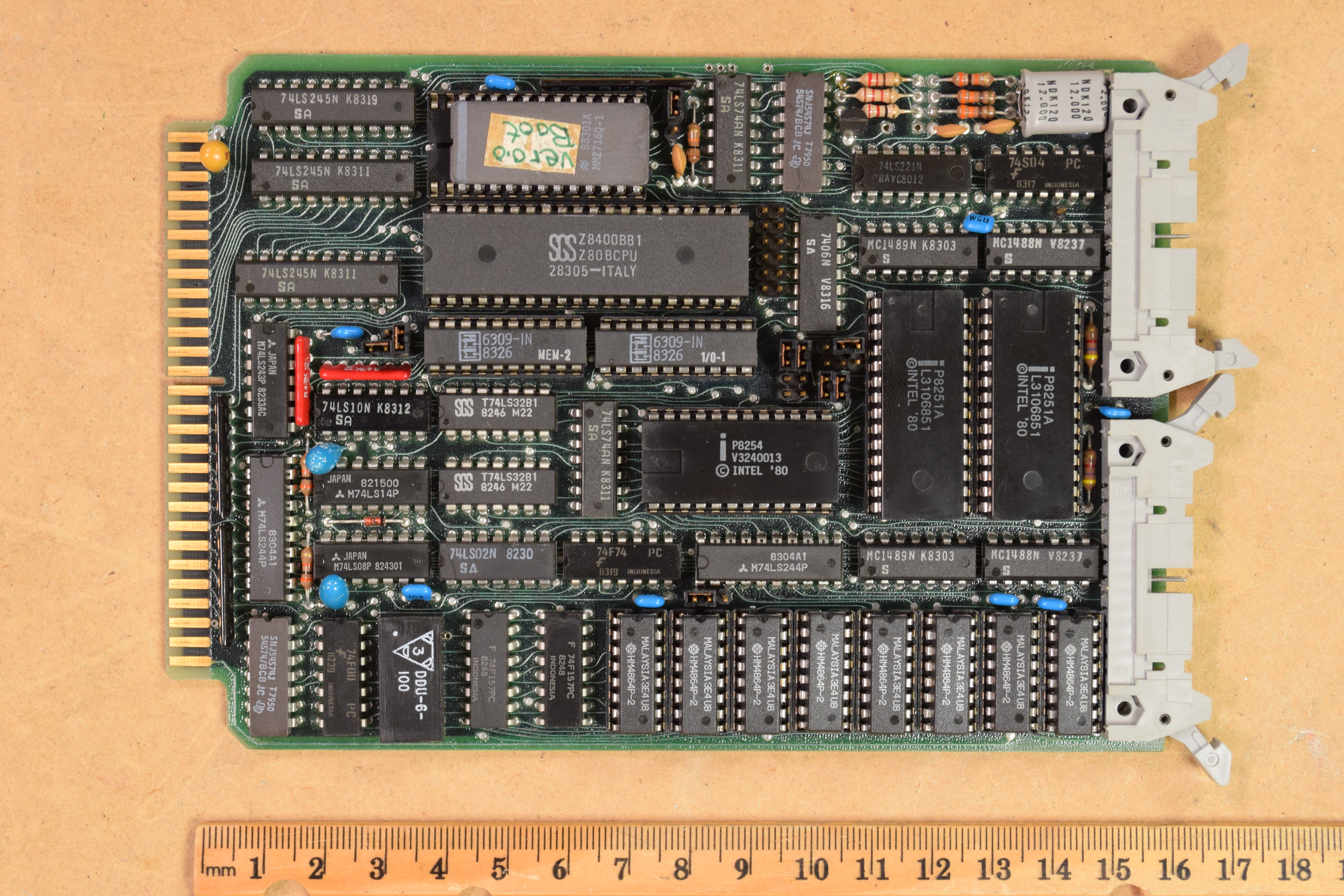
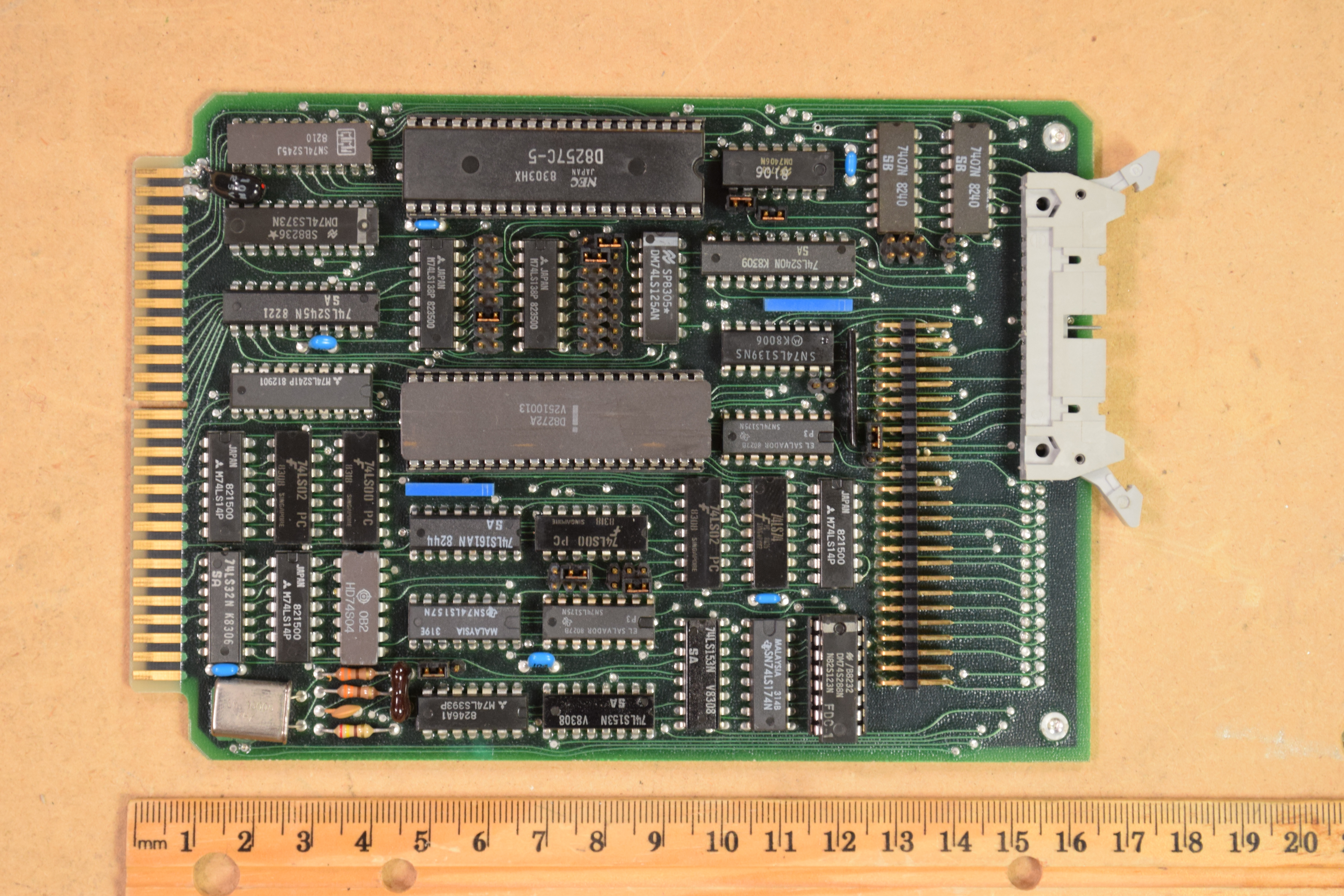
STD computer cards

The STD Bus is a computer bus that was used primarily for industrial control systems, but has also found applications in computing. The STD Bus has also been designated as STD-80, referring to its relation to the Zilog Z80 series microprocessors. The term STD is in reference to "standard", but several marketing terms were also promulgated, including simple to design, simple to debug, and swift to deliver.

== Description ==
The STD Bus uses 6.5" by 4.5" expansion card with an edge connector with 56 pins. Many different types of cards have been available for the STD Bus, from processing cards, RAM cards, I/O cards, and specialized cards for various applications.

The use of the STD bus has declined. From the over one hundred manufacturers of components during its peak, vendor numbers have dwindled to under a dozen, but it is still used by hobbyists, manufacturers and in industrial applications.

== Connector pin assignments ==
The STD Bus has a card edge connector with 56 contacts. The pin configuration is as follows. Flow is relative using an STD Bus processor card.

Pin	Mnemonic	Signal flow	Description	Pin	Mnemonic	Signal flow	Description
1	+5V	In	Logic power	2	+5V	In	Logic power
3	GND	In	Logic ground	4	GND	In	Logic ground
5	-5V	In	Negative logic power	6	-5V	In	Negative logic power
7	D3	In/out	Data bus	8	D7	In/out	Data bus
9	D2	In/out	Data bus	10	D6	In/out	Data bus
11	D1	In/out	Data bus	12	D5	In/out	Data bus
13	D0	In/out	Data bus	14	D4	In/out	Data bus
15	A7	Out	Address bus	16	A15	Out	Address bus
17	A6	Out	Address bus	18	A14	Out	Address bus
19	A5	Out	Address bus	20	A13	Out	Address bus
21	A4	Out	Address bus	22	A12	Out	Address bus
23	A3	Out	Address bus	24	A11	Out	Address bus
25	A2	Out	Address bus	26	A10	Out	Address bus
27	A1	Out	Address bus	28	A9	Out	Address bus
29	A0	Out	Address bus	30	A8	Out	Address bus
31	WR	Out	Write to memory or I/O	32	RD	Out	Read to memory or I/O
33	IORQ	Out	I/O address select	34	MEMRQ	Out	Memory address select
35	IOEX	Out	I/O expansion	36	MEMEX	Out	Memory expansion
37	REFRESH	Out	Refresh timing	38	MCSYNC	Out	CPU machine cycle sync
39	STATUS 1	Out	CPU status	40	STATUS 0	Out	CPU status
41	BUSAK	Out	Bus acknowledge	42	BUSRQ	In	Bus request
43	INTAK	Out	Interrupt acknowledge	44	INTRQ	In	Interrupt request
45	WAITRQ	In	Wait request	46	NMIRQ	In	Non-maskable interrupt
47	SYSRESET	Out	System reset	48	PBRESET	In	Push button reset
49	CLK	Out	Clock from processor	50	CNTRL	In	Aux timing
51	PCO	Out	Priority chain out	52	PCI	In	Priority chain in
53	AUX GND	In	Aux ground	54	AUX GND	In	Aux ground
55	AUX +12V	In	Aux positive	56	AUX -12V	In	Aux negative

== Applications ==
A focus of the STD bus was its ability to build a system using the exact bus cards required for an application. The compact size of a card made the STD bus system more adaptable to various applications than the contemporary computer buses of the mid-1980s such as the S-100 and the SS-50, because it could use servo control cards along with a fully programmable computer for mathematical operations.

In applications for running an astronomical observatory, the large industrial base of cards, and the system's expandability, made the system desirable for use in a photometry lab to control the telescope as well as do the data logging and computations required.

In typical university laboratory settings of the mid - late 80's, STD bus data acquisition systems were commonplace using Z80 or similar processor cards for the data capture, processing and control, parallel I/O cards for experiment control as well as analogue to digital conversion cards for reading experiment analogue parameters. Such systems would only occupy minimal rack space, while providing full CP/M processing features.

== STD-32 ==
The STD-32 is a pin compatible STD interface that allows the co-existence of both 8-bit and 32-bit systems on a single bus. This is accomplished by the addition of pins between the normal pins that do not connect, nor do they interfere with the original specification. This allows with the proper STD-32 backplane the ability to run legacy cards used for specific applications on the same bus without having to upgrade the complete system.
