= Mini-ITX =

17 × 17 cm motherboard

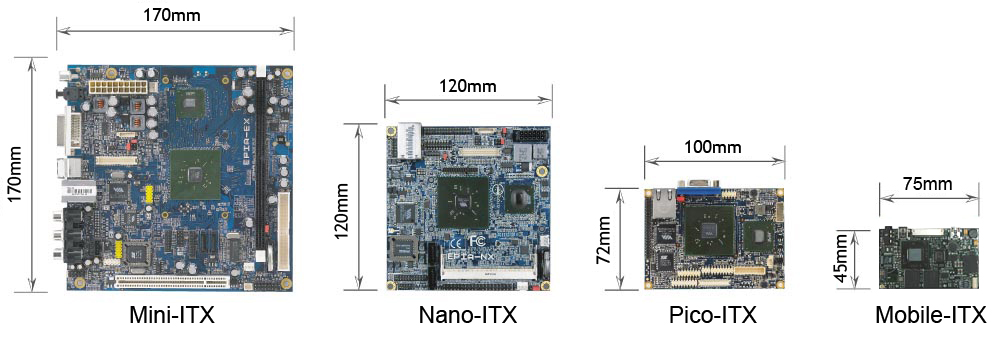
ITX motherboard form factor comparison

Comparison of the form factors for mini-ITX, mini-DTX, ATX, μATX (microATX) and DTX motherboards

Mini-ITX is a 170 mm × 170 mm (6.7 in × 6.7 in) motherboard form factor developed by VIA Technologies in 2001. Mini-ITX motherboards have been traditionally used in small-configured computer systems. Originally, Mini-ITX was a niche standard designed for fanless cooling with a low power consumption architecture, which made them useful for home theater PC systems, where fan noise can detract from the cinema experience.

The four mounting holes in a Mini-ITX board line up with four of the holes in ATX-specification motherboards, and the locations of the backplate and expansion slot are the same (though one of the holes used was optional in earlier versions of the ATX spec). Mini-ITX boards can therefore often be used in cases designed for ATX, micro-ATX and other ATX variants if desired.

Mini-ITX motherboards have only one expansion slot. Earlier Mini-ITX motherboards had a standard 33 MHz 5V 32-bit PCI slot, whereas newer motherboards use a PCI Express slot. Many older case designs use riser cards and some even have two-slot riser cards, although the two-slot riser cards are not compatible with all boards. Some boards based around non-x86 processors have a 3.3V PCI slot, and the Mini-ITX 2.0 (2008) boards have a PCI-Express ×16 slot; these boards are not compatible with the standard PCI riser cards supplied with older ITX (Information Technology eXtended) cases.

== History ==
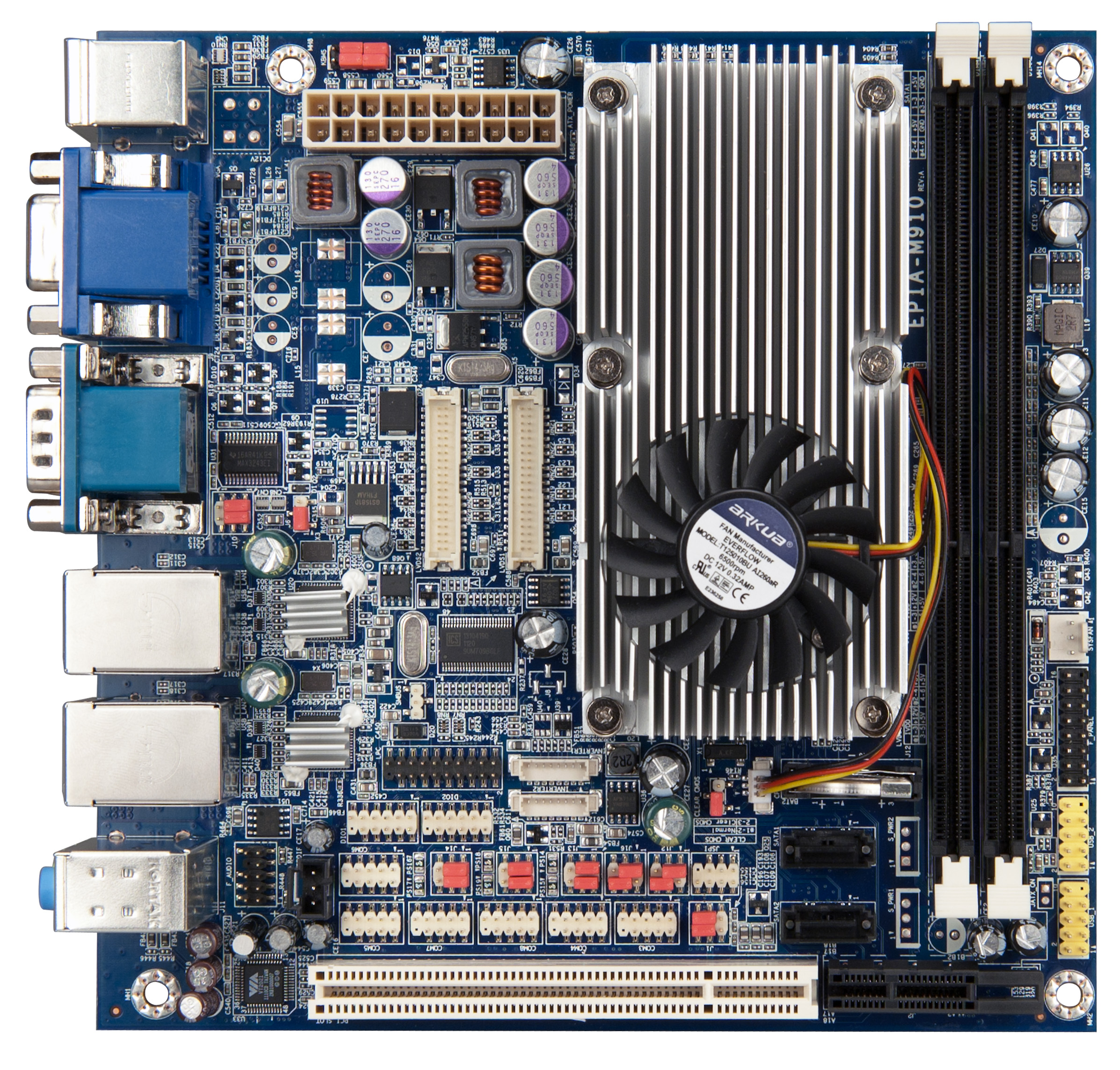
A VIA EPIA-M910 mini-ITX motherboard.

In March 2001, the chipset manufacturer VIA Technologies released a reference design for an ITX motherboard, to promote the low power C3 processor they had bought from Centaur Technology, in combination with their chipsets. Designed by Robert Kuo, VIA's chief R&D expert, the 215×191 mm VT6009 ITX Reference Board was demonstrated in "Information PC" and set-top box configurations. At that point, few manufacturers took up the ITX design, but Shuttle, Jetway, etc. produced many ITX based cube computers. Other manufactures instead produced smaller boards based on the very similar 229×191 mm FlexATX configuration.

In October 2001, VIA announced their decision to create a new motherboard division, to provide standardized infrastructure for lower-cost PC iterations, and focus on embedded devices. The result was the November 2001 release of the VT6010 Mini-ITX reference design (again by Robert Kuo), once again touted as an "Information PC", or low cost entry level x86 computing platform. Manufacturers were still reluctant, but customer response was much more receptive, so VIA decided to manufacture and sell the boards themselves. In April 2002 the first Mini-ITX motherboards—VIA's EPIA 5000 (fanless 533 MHz Eden processor) and EPIA 800 (800 MHz C3)—were sold to industrial customers.

Enthusiasts soon noticed the advantages of small size, low noise and power consumption, and started to push the boundaries of case modding into something else—building computers into nearly every object imaginable, and sometimes even creating new cases altogether. Hollowed out vintage computers, humidors, toys, electronics, musical instruments, and even a 1960s-era toaster have become homes to relatively quiet, or even silent Mini-ITX systems, capable of many of the tasks of a modern desktop PC.

Mini-ITX boards primarily appeal to the industrial and embedded PC markets, with the majority sold as bulk components or integrated into a finished system for single-purpose computing applications. They are produced with a much longer sales life-cycle than consumer boards (some of the original EPIAs are still available), a quality that industrial users typically require. Manufacturers can prototype using standard cases and power supplies, then build their own enclosures if volumes get high enough. Typical applications include playing music in supermarkets, powering self-service kiosks, and driving content on digital displays.

VIA continues to expand its Mini-ITX motherboard line. Some earlier generations included the original PL133 chipset boards (dubbed the "Classic" boards), CLE266 chipset boards (adding MPEG-2 acceleration), and CN400 boards (which added MPEG-4 acceleration). Second generation boards featured the EPIA M, MII, CL, PD, TC and MS — all tailored to slightly different markets. Legacy VIA boards use their x86-compatible CPUs — the C3, C7 or low-power Eden variants, with newer boards featuring the VIA Nano CPU, launched in May 2008. Other manufacturers have also produced boards designed around the same layout, using VIA, but also Intel, AMD, Transmeta and PowerPC technology.

Intel introduced a line of Mini-ITX boards for the Atom CPU, which demonstrates a significant increase in processing performance (but without added power consumption) over older VIA C3 and C7 offerings and helps make the design viable for personal computers. Other manufacturers saw the potential of the design, and followed suit, some even not limiting themselves to the Atom, as evidenced by Zotac GeForce 9300-ITX board that supports Core 2 Duo CPUs with FSB frequencies up to 1333 MHz, two separate-channeled 800 MHz memory slots and fully functional PCI Express 2.0 x16 slot that could connect through SLI to the onboard video. This new wave of offerings made Mini-ITX much more popular among home users, hobbyists, and even overclockers.

== Intel-based products ==
=== Onboard CPU ===
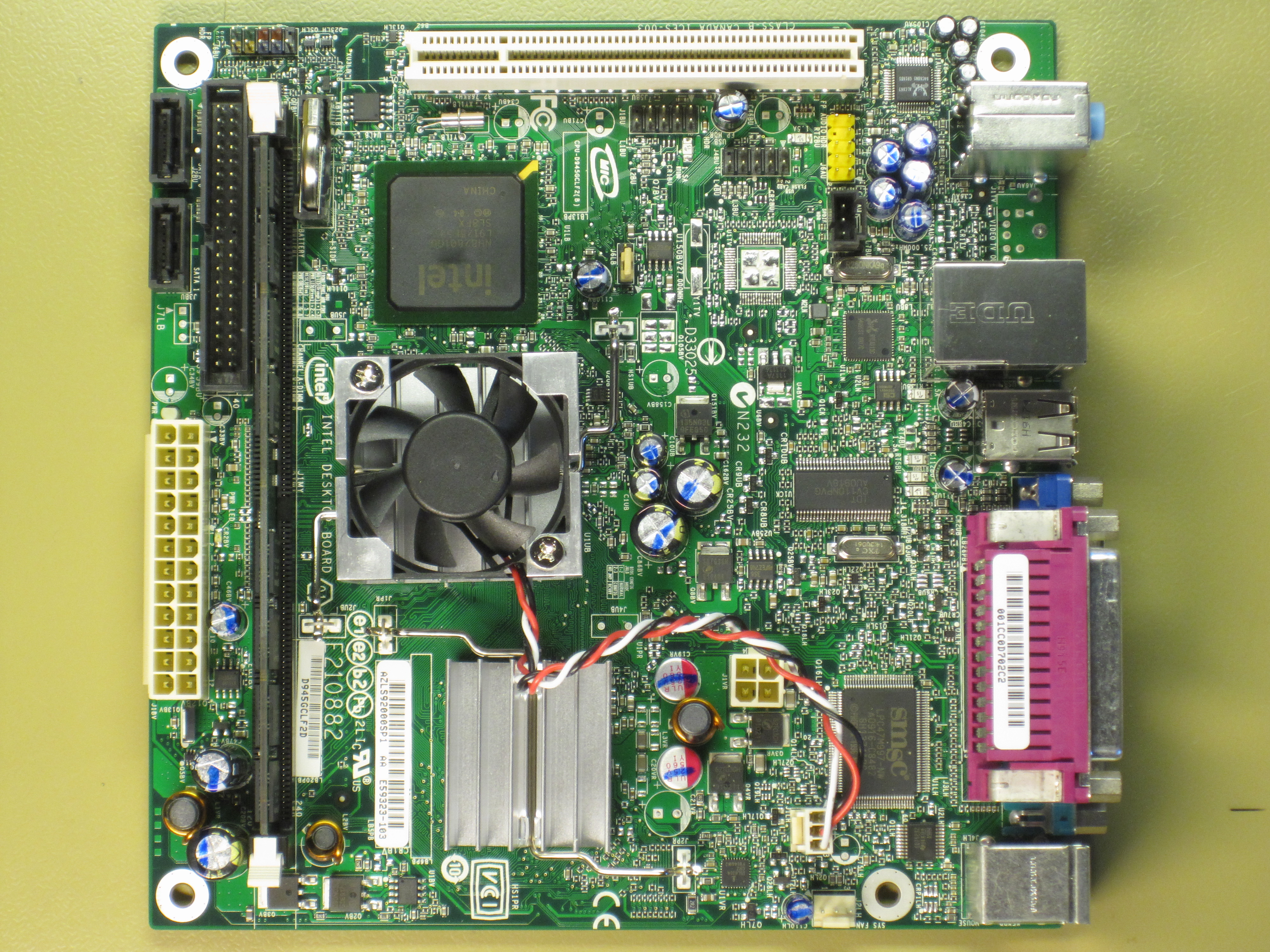
Intel D945GCLF2D Atom 330 Mini-ITX motherboard

A number of manufacturers have released Mini-ITX motherboards that feature embedded CPUs, often mobile or low-TDP versions. These processors are designed to draw minimal power resulting in lower TDP ideal for fanless (passively cooled) configurations and embedded applications.

=== Socketed CPU ===
Starting from LGA 775, socketed Intel Mini-ITX motherboards have been released by Intel and Zotac. This was followed by LGA 1156 motherboards Starting from LGA 1155, Mini-ITX motherboards have started to become mainstream, with many different manufacturers releasing products. This is partly because almost all Sandy Bridge and Ivy Bridge Intel Celeron, Pentium and Core series CPUs have integrated processor graphics, eliminating the need for motherboard graphics or discrete graphics cards. This trend continues with LGA 1150, LGA 1151, and LGA 1200 CPUs.

Due to the limitations of the Mini-ITX design, and the physical size of the LGA 2011 socket, Mini-ITX motherboards with the socket only support a single PCI Express expansion slot, and they require using the narrow-ILM version of the LGA 2011 socket. Despite this, manufacturers have released LGA 2011 based Mini-ITX motherboards.

Also, Mini-ITX motherboards with the LGA 2066 socket have been released, with four SODIMM slots.

== AMD-based products ==
A number of manufacturers have released several socketed AMD Mini-ITX motherboards, supporting Socket AM2, Socket AM2+, Socket AM3, Socket FM1, Socket FM2, Socket FM2+, Socket AM1 and Socket AM4 CPUs. Socket AM2+ and AM3 ITX motherboards have integrated motherboard graphics, while discrete graphics or processor integrated graphics are required for other platforms.

Mini-ITX motherboards with integrated AMD CPUs are also released. These motherboards often use mobile CPUs and passive cooling, and feature more powerful integrated graphics compared to their Intel counterparts, which makes them suitable for HTPC.

== Transmeta-based products ==
IBASE made the first Transmeta-based Mini-ITX motherboard, the MB860. The board uses Transmeta Efficeon processors that run at up to 1.2 GHz. It supports SODIMM DDR modules with capacities up to 1 GB. An onboard 16 MB ATI M7 graphics controller supports 3D games and graphical intensive programs. It provides four USB 2.0 ports, a Realtek 8100C 10/100 Mbit/s BaseT Ethernet and an optional 8110S Gigabit Ethernet controller.

== PowerPC-based products ==
The first PowerPC motherboards were produced by Eyetech in 2005 but they stopped any activity in 2005. In 2007 ACube Systems produced a new board, the Sam440ep, primarily for the AmigaOS market.

== ARM-based products ==
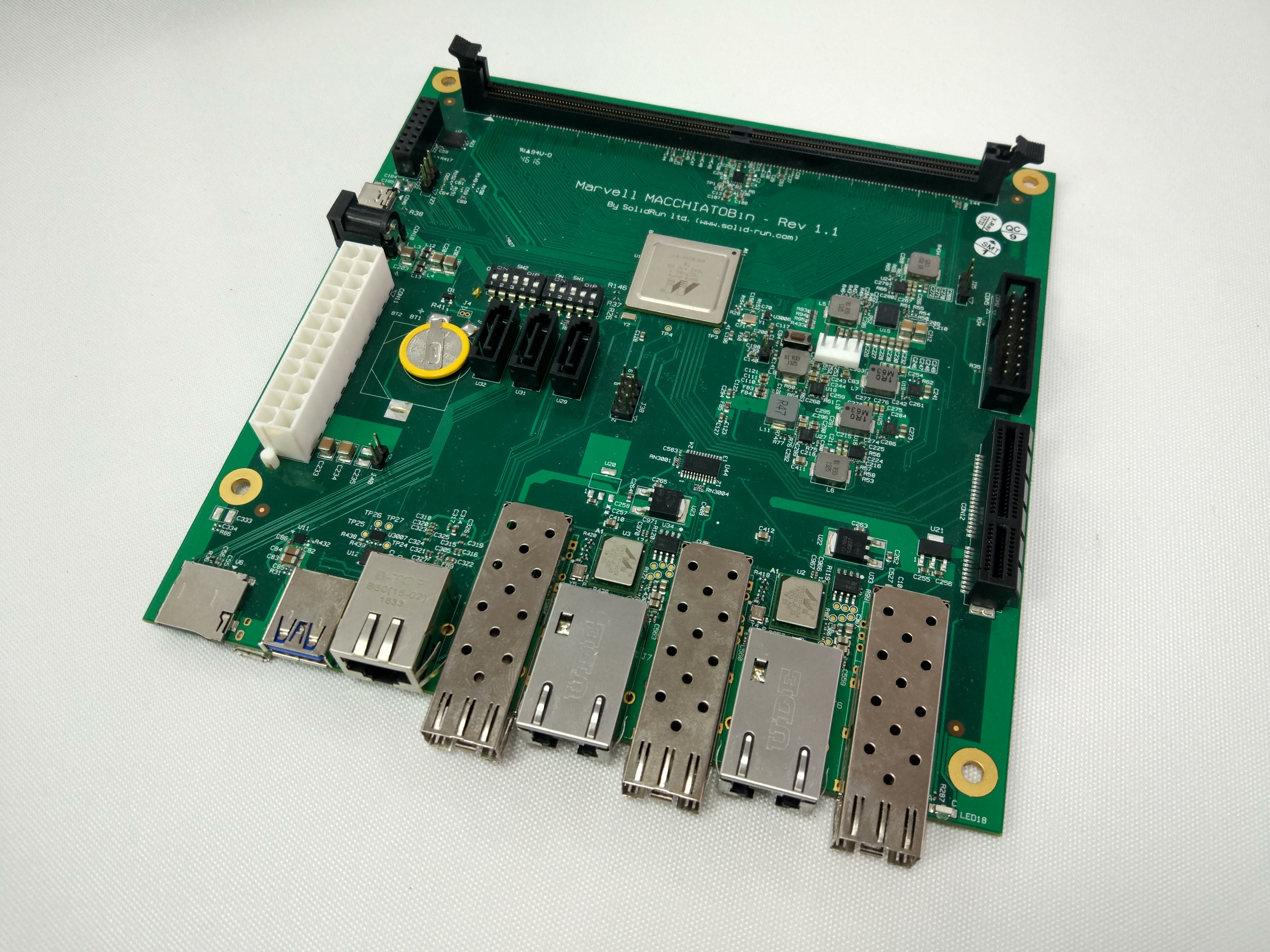
MACCHIATObin ARM-based Mini-ITX network development board by Marvell and SolidRun

Cadia Networks developed a Mini ITX ARM board, which comes with an ARM Cortex-A8 Freescale i.MX53 series CPU. According to the official website, the board "offers an ultra-low power SoC with a variety of I/O and OS support for Android / Linux2.6 / Windows Embedded Compact 7".

Kontron also developed a mini ITX ARM board. According to the website, it features an "ARM Cortex-A9 Quad Core 900MHz Processor with NEON Technology", an Nvidia graphics processor, 2 GB of RAM, and a targeted power consumption of < 7W for the entire board.

AppliedMicro offers the XC-1 Server Development Platform motherboard, which uses the X-Gene ARMv8 system on a chip with 8 2.4 GHz CPU cores, supports 128 GB DDR3 DRAM using 16 GB DIMMs, and has a baseboard management controller.

== Power ==
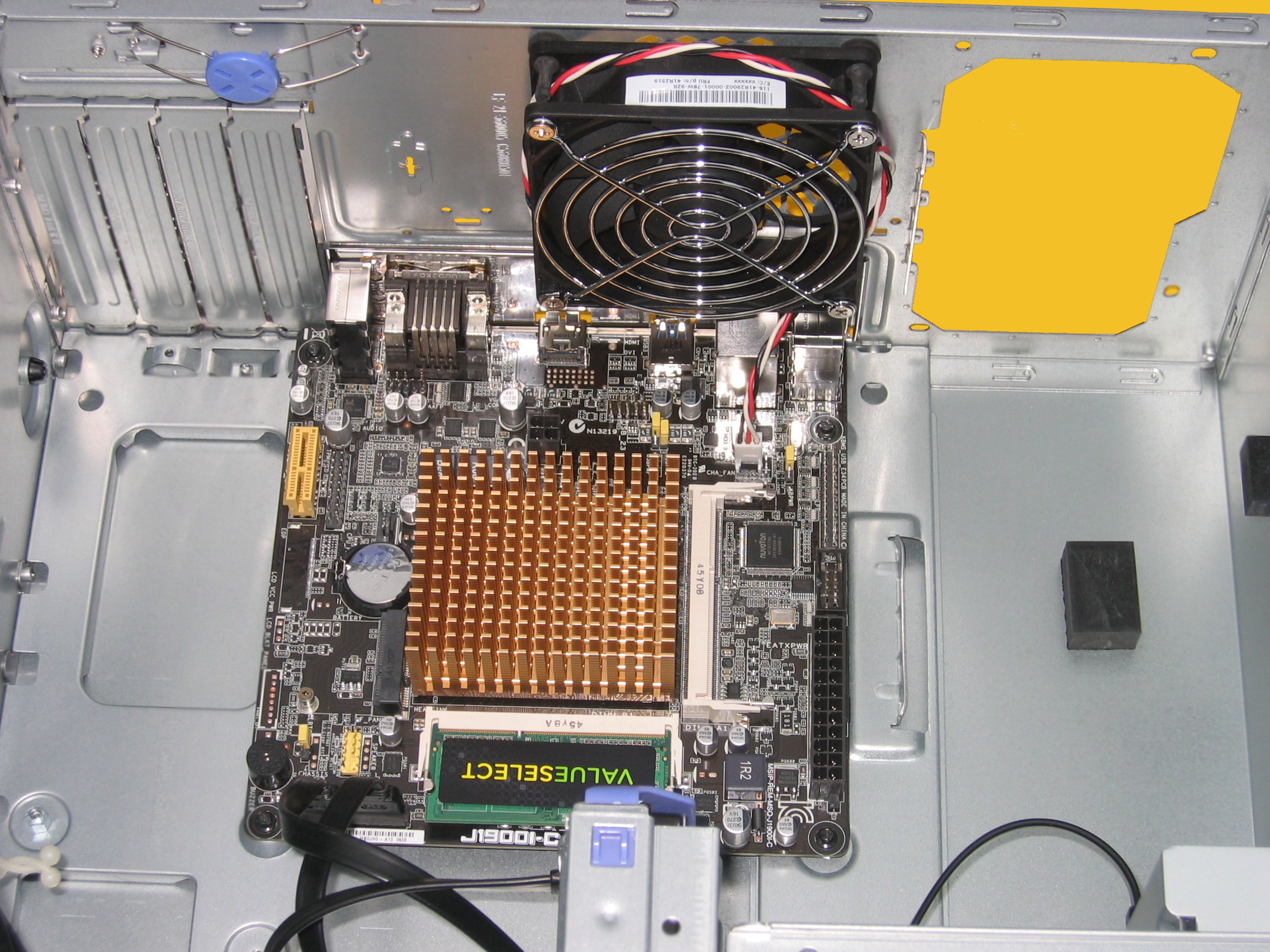
Mini-ITX 2.0 SoC mainboard with ATX12V connector installed in a Micro-ATX computer case.

The Mini-ITX standard does not define a standard for the computer power supply, though it suggests possible options. Conventionally Mini-ITX boards use a 20- or 24-pin "original ATX" power connector. This is usually connected to a DC-DC converter board, which connects to an external power adapter. Generally, vendors provide both power adapter and DC-DC board with the case.

Some boards have built in DC-DC converters and converters have also been made to plug directly into the ATX connector (e.g. the PicoPSU), either of these options avoids the need to mount a separate DC-DC converter into the case, saving space and design effort. Boards using full-power Intel or AMD CPUs typically use ATX12V 2.x connections and require a case with appropriate power supply and cooling for these more power-hungry chips. Defined by the ATX specification, power supplies with ATX12V connector on a separate 12 volts rail must not idle that 12 volts rail.

== See also ==
- EPIA, Mini-ITX, Nano-ITX and Pico-ITX motherboards from VIA
- Home Theater PC
- Mini ATX, 15 × 15 cm (5.9 × 5.9 in) form factor developed by AOpen
- Mobile-ITX
- Nano-ITX
- Pico-ITX
- Plug computer
- Single-board computer
- SFF computer
