= Nano-ITX =

Computer motherboard form factor

Nano-ITX is a computer motherboard form factor first proposed by VIA Technologies at CeBIT in March 2003, and implemented in late 2005. Nano-ITX boards measure 12 × 12 cm (4.7 × 4.7 in), and are fully integrated, very low power consumption motherboards with many uses, but targeted at smart digital entertainment devices such as DVRs, set-top boxes, media centers, car PCs, and thin devices. Nano-ITX motherboards have slots for SO-DIMM.

There are four Nano-ITX motherboard product lines so far, VIA's EPIA N, EPIA NL, EPIA NX, and the VIA EPIA NR. These boards are available from a wide variety of manufacturers supporting numerous different CPU platforms.

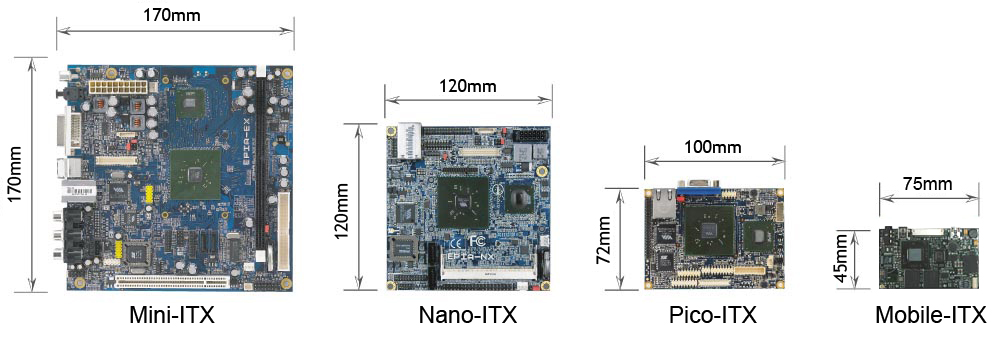
ITX motherboard form factor comparison

Udoo has now released at least 1 nano-ITX board: the Udoo Bolt.

== See also ==
- Mini-ITX
- Pico-ITX
- Mobile-ITX
- EPIA, mini-ITX and nano-ITX motherboards from VIA
- Ultra-Mobile PC
- Minimig, is an open source re-implementation of an Amiga 500 in Nano-ITX format
