= Mobile-ITX =

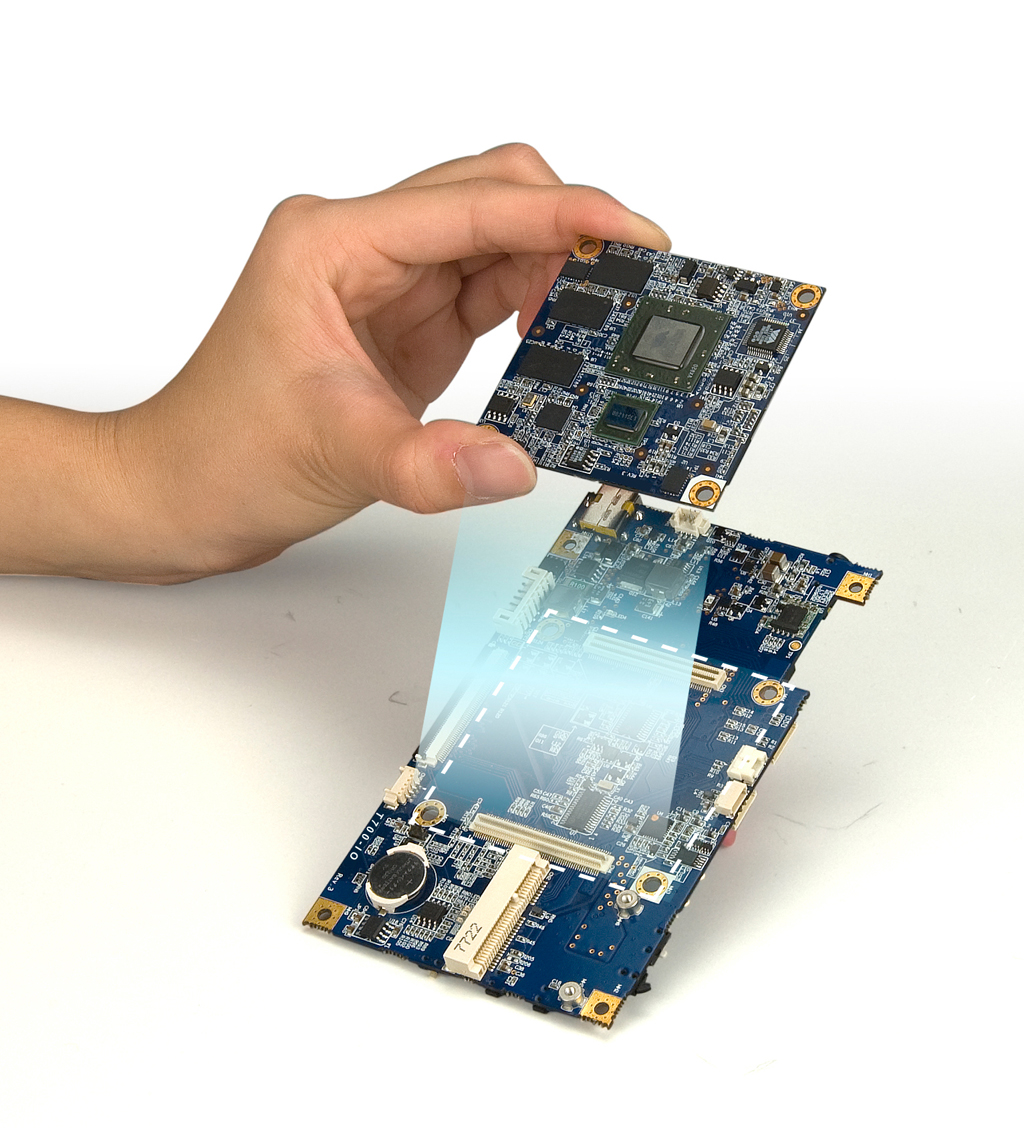
A Mobile-ITX CPU module with an IO-board

Mobile-ITX is the smallest (by 2009) x86 compliant motherboard form factor presented by VIA Technologies in December, 2009. The motherboard size (CPU module) is 60 × 60 mm (2.4 × 2.4 in). There are no computer ports on the CPU module and it is necessary to use an I/O carrier board. The design is intended for medical, transportation and military embedded markets.

== History ==
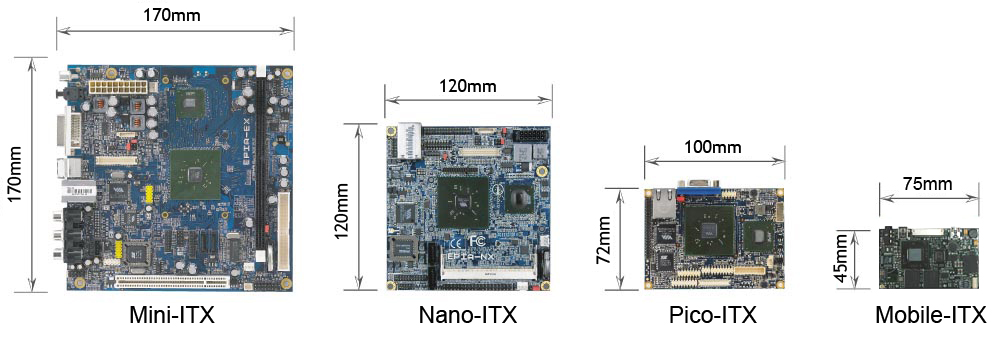
ITX motherboard form factor comparison

The Mobile-ITX form factor was announced by VIA Technologies at Computex in June, 2007. The motherboard size of first prototypes was 75 × 45 mm (3.0 × 1.8 in). The design was intended for ultra-mobile computing such as a smartphone or UMPC.

The prototype boards shown to date include a x86-compliant 1 GHz VIA C7-M processor, 256 or 512 megabytes of RAM, a modified version of the VIA CX700 chipset (called the CX700S), an interface for a cellular radio module (demonstration boards contain a CDMA radio), a DC-DC electrical converter, and various connecting interfaces.

At the announcement, an ultra-mobile PC reference design was shown running Windows XP Embedded.
