= Kontron =

Computer hardware and software company

Kontron AG
- Type: Public
- Traded as: FWB: KTN; SDAX
- Industry: Computer hardware; computer software
- Founded: 1959; 67 years ago
- Founder: Branco Weiss
- Headquarters: Linz, Austria
- Key people: Hannes Niederhauser (CEO and chairman of the executive board); Clemens Billek (CFO)
- Products: Industrial internet of things, Embedded systems, motherboards, daughterboards, computer-on-modules, monitors, industrial PCs
- Revenue: €1,685 billion (2024)
- Operating income: €114.2 million (2024)
- Net income: €90.7 million (2024)
- Total assets: €1,823 million (end 2024)
- Total equity: €652 million (end 2024)
- Number of employees: 7,000 (end 2024)
- Website: www.kontron.com

Kontron AG is an Austrian-based multinational group headquartered in Linz, specialising in IoT technologies and embedded computer solutions.

The globally operating company offers hardware and software solutions as well as services, including technologies for artificial intelligence, 5G, and edge computing. Kontron focuses on the automation of industrial processes, the optimisation of intelligent and secure transport systems, and developments in the fields of communication/connectivity, medical technology, and energy – including renewable energies such as solar power and electromobility. Through its in-house development and production services, Kontron covers entire value chains.

The company is listed on the SDAX and TecDAX of the German Stock Exchange and employs more than 7,000 people in 20 countries.

== History ==
Kontron was founded in 1959 by Branco Weiss in Zurich as a service provider for scientific instruments and, among other things, developed ultrasonic measuring devices for obstetrics and equipment for blood group determination. In 1974, Weiss sold the company to Hoffmann-La Roche, which in 1989 sold it on to the Munich-based car manufacturer BMW, which used it for the development of control systems, hardware and software for x86 processor technology.

From the acquired Kontron AG, Hoffmann-La Roche AG carved out Kontron Medizintechnik AG (founded in 1980 in Eching as Kontron Leiterplatten GmbH) and in 1984 transferred it to the subsidiary Kontron Instruments AG, established in 1971 in Neufahrn near Freising. The company moved its registered office to Zurich in 1988 and subsequently to Schlieren and Rotkreuz. When operations there were discontinued in 1994 and the company was to be transferred to Kontron Immobilien AG in Dübendorf, employees founded ECR AG as a management buyout from Roche Diagnostics.

In 2000, the now independent Kontron Embedded Computers AG was listed on the Neuer Markt.

The corporate group was originally headquartered in Augsburg and consisted of the Kontron Europe GmbH, with its main sites in Ismaning, Augsburg, Deggendorf, and Saarbrücken (other locations included San Diego, Fremont, California, Montreal, Plzeň, Toulon, Bangalore, Taipei, Tokyo and Beijing).

Effective 1 September 2000, Kontron purchased the industrial computer manufacturer PEP Modular Computers of Kaufbeuren.

In 2002, the leading providers in the field of embedded computer technology, Kontron AG and JUMPtec AG, decided to merge. Shareholder approvals were granted at the JUMPtec AGM on 19 June 2002 and at the Kontron AGM on 3 July 2002. At that time, more than 1,400 employees were working for the two companies in over 20 countries. In December 2004, 13 former JUMPtec and Kontron employees founded Congatec in Deggendorf.

Kontron acquired Dolch in 2005.

At the 2007 Embedded World trade exhibition in Nuremberg, Kontron introduced a product called UGM-M72, a modular graphics card for Computer-on-Module systems, which was based on Universal Graphics Module (UGM) design specification standard published by XGI Technology and Kontron in June 2007. The card used the M72 GPU from ATI Technologies, and was 84 x 95 mm in size. Version 1.1 of UGM standard was published in July 2008, and Advanced Micro Devices (the parent company of ATI) announced in August 2008 that it would support the new standard. A web site for UGM standard was maintained by XGI and Kontron until the Great Recession in 2009.

In September 2009, Kontron Compact Computer AG acquired a majority stake in DIGITAL-LOGIC AG in Luterbach (Switzerland) from company founder Felix Kunz, a manufacturer of embedded PCs and computer systems. Three years later, this plant was closed.

As announced on 20 May 2010, Kontron, via its US subsidiary, acquired 100% of the US AP Labs group, based in San Diego, California. The acquired company is regarded as one of the leading system integrators in the defence and aerospace sectors and develops highly complex, rugged computer systems and specialised applications.

On 24 July 2013, Kontron announced that it would close the Eching, Roding and Kaufbeuren sites by mid-2014 and concentrate its business at the Augsburg location.

In 2017, as announced in February of that year, Kontron was taken over by the Austrian IT services company S&T AG, after S&T had already acquired a 30 per cent stake in Kontron in October 2016. The purchase was largely financed by Taiwanese contract manufacturer Foxconn, which acquired just under 30 per cent of S&T AG through a capital increase.

In June 2022, the parent company S&T was renamed Kontron AG and the registered office of the new Kontron AG was relocated to Linz, Austria.

In August 2022, Kontron AG sold significant parts of its IT services business to VINCI Energies S.A., part of the listed French group VINCI.

In July and August 2023, Kontron acquired Comlab AG (a Swiss company manufacturing data communication repeaters for railways), Hartmann and W-IE-NE-R group of companies from Phoenix Mecano, and Cellular Automotive Module Unit from Telit Cinterion. In September 2023, it was announced that Kontron acquired Altimate, the Bucharest-headquartered software company specialising in traffic control, automated fare collection, tolling, and enforcement of traffic violations.

In January 2024, the largest acquisition in the company’s history to date took place with the majority takeover of Katek SE. This broadened the product portfolio in the renewables segment (EV charging, solar) and significantly expanded the Group’s manufacturing options. The number of employees increased to around 7,000 worldwide as a result of this acquisition, and revenue rose to €1.685 billion (2024).

For 2025, Kontron expects revenue growth to €1.800 million. For operating profit (EBITDA), Kontron anticipates growth to at least €270 million.

== Product areas ==
The product range of the Kontron Group comprises services as well as cross-industry hardware and software solutions in the IoT sector, with a focus on industrial automation. According to the company website (as of 2025), the products and solutions are structured into: boards and standard form factors, systems, software & solutions, customised products, and services.

The service and software portfolio of the Kontron Group is divided into the following segments (selection):

=== Susietec Toolset ===
The Susietec Toolset is an IoT toolset that provides approaches and methods for implementing digital transformation and IoT adaptation in enterprises. It is designed to integrate hardware and software components and to support analysis, system consulting, and implementation. The toolset is intended as a package of measures to increase responsiveness to the challenges of digital transformation and to implement IoT solutions. The focus lies on the optimisation of operational processes and strengthening competitiveness.

=== KontronOS ===
KontronOS is a Linux-based operating system developed for the industrial IoT cloud sector. It is designed to ensure the security and up-to-dateness of edge devices. The system takes into account individual requirements of both software and hardware.

=== Industrial automation ===
Hardware and software solutions for IoT and Industry 4.0. The product portfolio includes both standardised and adapted solutions, such as industrial control, industrial visualisation, industrial IoT, and building automation.

=== Mobile Private Networks ===
Mobile Private Networks (MPNs) are used in particular for safety-critical IoT applications. Use cases include sensor data monitoring, localisation and tracking, robotics, automated guided vehicles (AGVs), augmented reality, and employee connectivity. They are applied in business-critical systems and applications, such as at transport hubs, in production facilities, machine halls, and warehousing.

=== Transportation ===
End-to-end communication solutions for business-critical railway networks. The portfolio includes GSM-Railways, FRMCS, TETRA, DMR, LTE solutions for mission-critical networks, as well as mobility solutions for public transport.

=== VPX ===
VPX (VITA 46) is an industry standard and the successor to the VME bus for embedded systems operating in harsh environments, particularly in the defense sector. Rather than the parallel VMEbus, it uses high-speed serial switch fabrics. The OpenVPX specification (VITA 65) further defines system and backplane profiles to ensure interoperability between VPX components. Kontron produces VPX components for 3U and 6U systems, including processor and I/O boards, carrier cards, switches, as well as chassis and development platforms.

=== Hardware Portfolio ===
==== Boards and Standard Form Factors ====
- Single Board Computer
- Motherboards
- VME
- VPX
- SOM
- CompactPCI
- PMC / XMC / FMC

==== Systems ====
Under the Systems category, Kontron offers complete industrial computer and automation solutions that combine hardware and software and are used across multiple industries.

- Embedded Box PCs
- Industrial Monitors
- Panel PCs
- Workstations
- Rackmount Systems
- Network Switching
- Control Units & I/O Modules
- Cloud Systems
- Multi-Edge Server
- Rugged Tlatforms for Harsh Environments

=== Software & solutions ===
- Kontron Susietec IoT Toolset
- Artificial intelligence
- Security
- Control and Monitoring
- Safety

=== Custom products (customer-specific products) ===
For applications where standard products are not suitable, Kontron offers semi- and full-custom designs tailored to the specific requirements of the application.

=== Electronics² ===
Under the service brand “Electronics²”, Kontron offers development and manufacturing services as well as products worldwide.

=== Former Kontron products (selection) ===
- Kontron PSI 80
- Analyser based on the Z80, CP/M and ECL logic
- Various laboratory measurement instruments (frequency counters, function generators, pulse generators, etc.)
- COM Express
- COM-HPC
- SMARC
- Qseven

== Subsidiaries ==
As of July 2024, the subsidiaries of the group include:

- Kontron Europe
- Kontron Bulgaria
- Kontron AIS
- susietec
- Kontron Technologies
- Kontron Transportation
- Kontron Slovenia
- Kontron Medical
- S&T Medtech
- Smart Metering
- Solutions for Power Systems
- Kontron ODM/EMS Alliance
- Kontron Services Austria
- Kontron Hungary
- Kontron Services Romania
- Kontron Slovenia
- Kontron Americas
- Kontron Asia

== See also ==
- Kontron Group
