= Qseven =

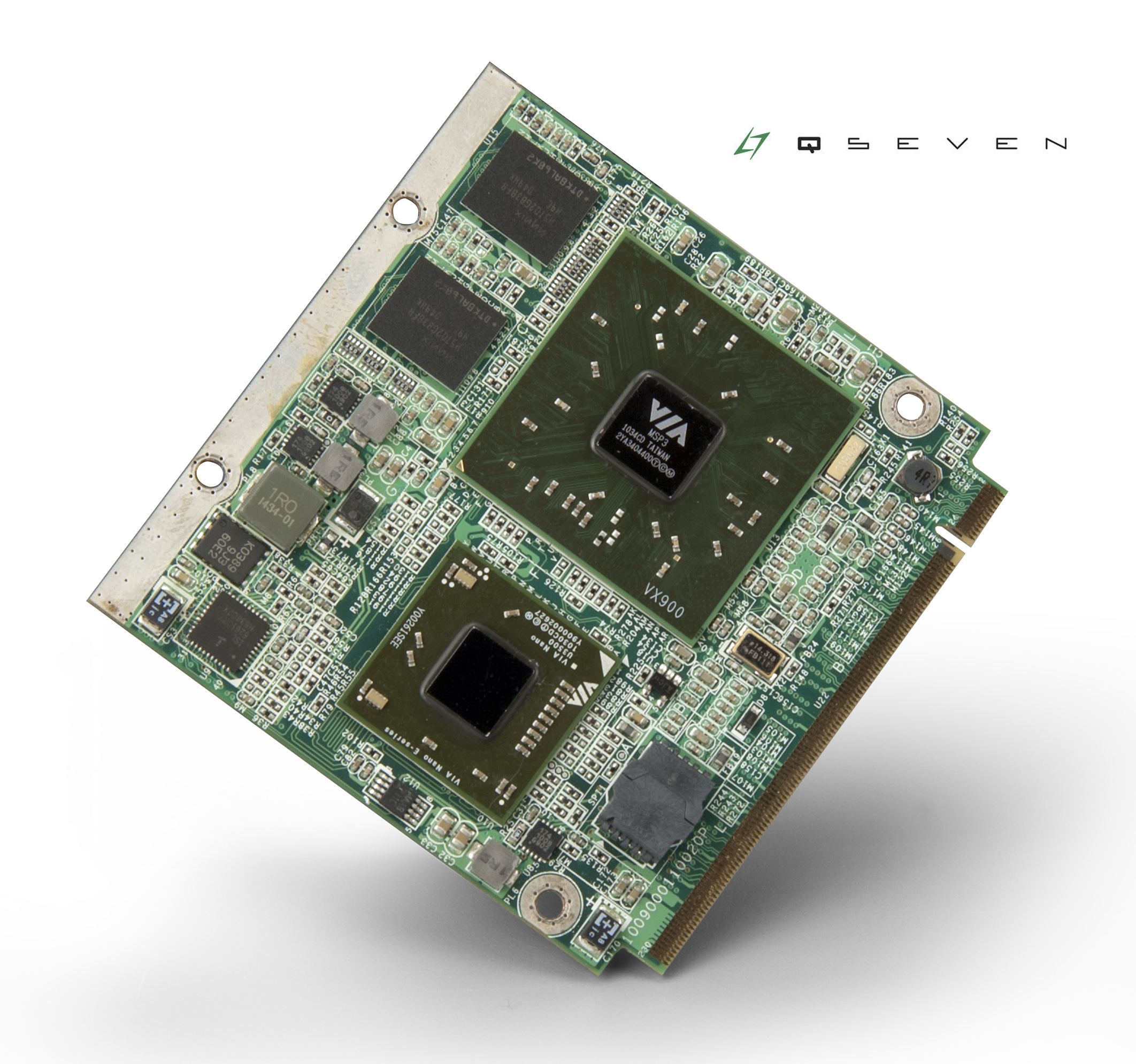
Qseven module VIA QSM-8Q90 with VIA Nano U3500

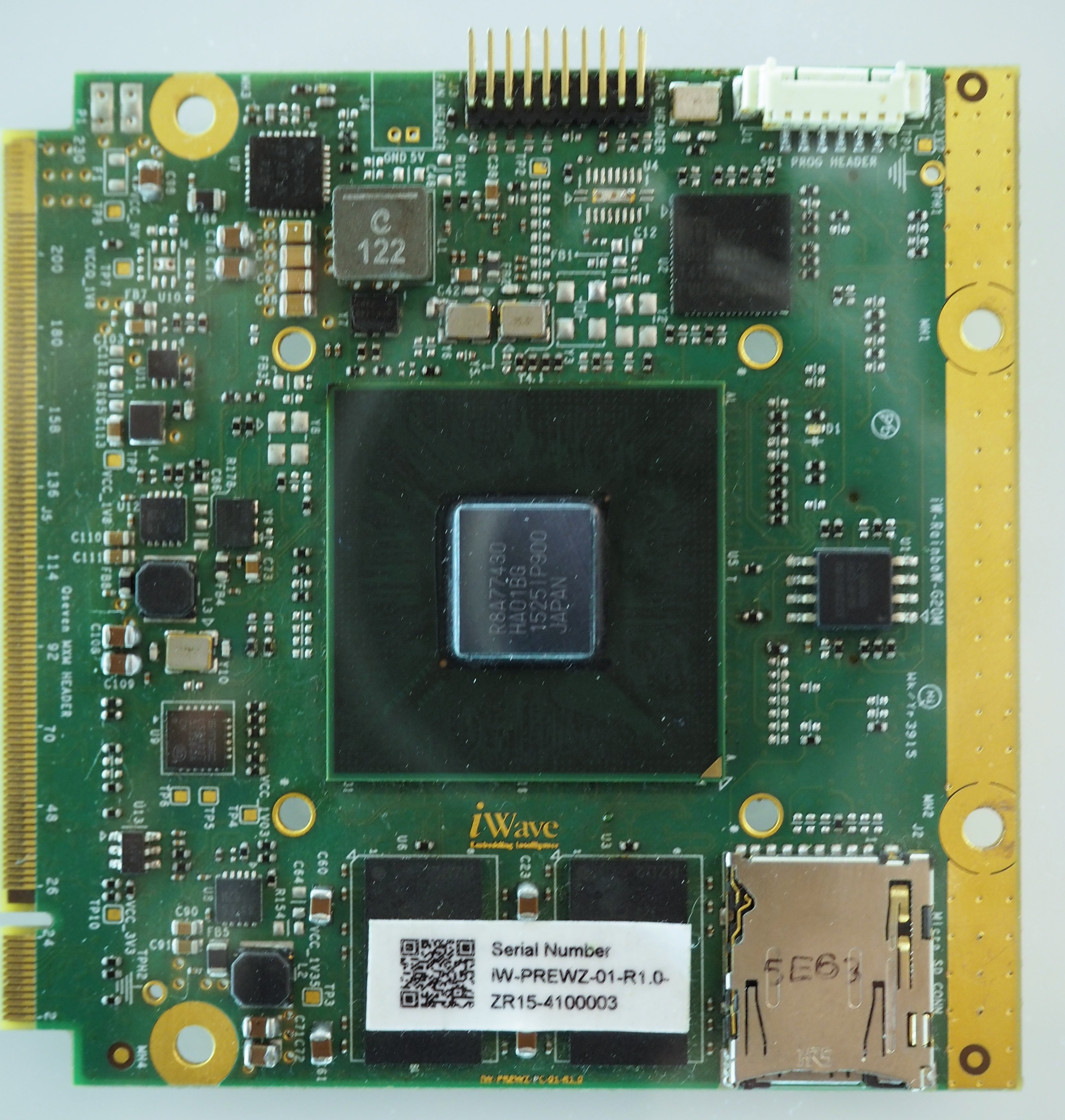
Wseven module iWave iW-RainbowW-G20M with Renesas RZ/G1M (ARM Cortex-A15)

Qseven, a computer-on-module (COM) form factor, is a small, highly integrated computer module that can be used in a design application much like an integrated circuit component. It is smaller than other computer-on-module standards such as COM Express, ETX or XTX and is limited to very low power consuming CPUs. The maximum power consumption should be no more than 12 watts.

== Specification ==
The name comes from the word "quadratic" due to the square shape of the original module, 70 mm on a side. Qseven was specified by Congatec, MSC and SECO in July 2008 as an independent standard for industry-level applications. Other companies based in Europe such as Kontron adopted the standard, but after a few years it had not yet been popular in the USA. The Qseven specification is hosted by the Standardization Group for Embedded Technologies (SGeT), which took over from the original Qseven consortium in 2013. The revision 2.0 was released 9 September 2012, and 2.1 on 25 February 2016.

The Qseven design guide provides information for designing a custom system carrier board for Qseven modules. It includes reference schematics for the external circuitry required to implement various peripheral functions. It also explains how to extend the supported buses and how to add additional peripherals and expansion slots to a Qseven-based system. It's available from the Qseven consortium webpage.

Since the release of Specification 1.20 (10 September 2010) Qseven modules can be based on x86 or ARM architectures.

=== Interfaces ===
The Qseven specification defines a rich set of legacy-free interfaces. Older interfaces like PCI, ISA, RS-232 or EIDE are not supported.

- 4× PCI Express ×1 lanes
- 2× SATA
- 8× USB 2.0
- 1× 1000BaseT Ethernet
- 1× SDIO 4-bit
- Low-voltage differential signaling (LVDS) 2× 24-bit
- SDVO / HDMI / DisplayPort (shared)
- HDA (High Definition Audio)
- I²C Bus
- Low Pin Count bus
- CAN bus (Controller–area network)
- Serial Peripheral Interface (SPI) bus

=== Sizes ===
- 70 mm × 70 mm;
- 70 mm × 40 mm.

=== Connector ===
Qseven uses one 230 pin MXM2 SMT edge connector to connect all power and signal lanes to the carrier board. This connector is available from multiple vendors at different heights (5.5 mm and 7.8 mm).

== See also ==
- ETX
- XTX
- COM Express
- Smart Mobility Architecture (SMARC) another specification from the same group
