= Mobile PCI Express Module =

Form factors for GPUs in laptops

MXM slot
- Mobile PCI Express Module
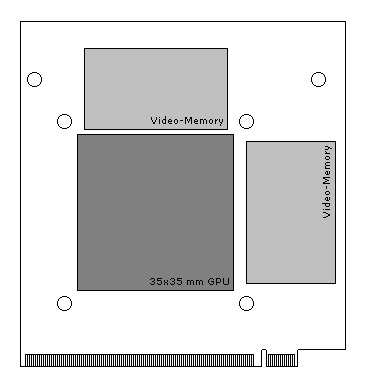
- Reference design of a first generation MXM-II card for 35 mm GPU
- No. of devices: 1
- Style: Serial
- External interface: no

Mobile PCI Express Module (MXM) is an interconnect standard for GPUs (MXM Graphics Modules) in laptops using PCI Express created by MXM-SIG. The goal was to create a non-proprietary, industry standard socket, so one could easily upgrade the graphics processor in a laptop, without having to buy a whole new system or relying on proprietary vendor upgrades.

A rare photo of a MXM-IV graphics card (GeForce Go 7950 GTX)

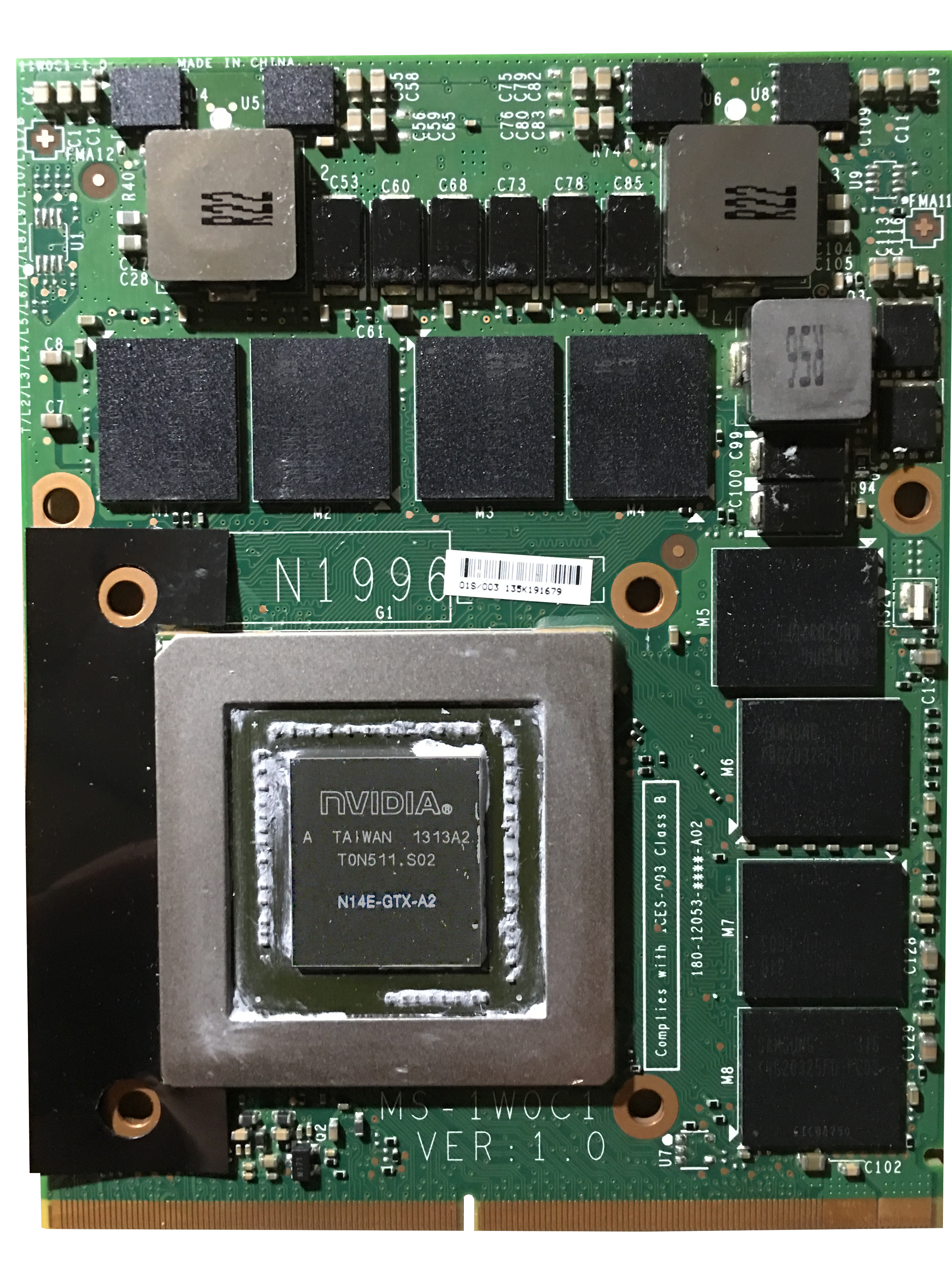
A GTX 780M GPU with MXM3 socket

== Generations ==
Smaller graphics modules can be inserted into larger slots, but type I and II heatsinks will not fit type III and above or vice versa.

Dell's Alienware m5700 platform uses a heatsink that will fit Type I, II, & III cards without modification.

MXM 3.1 was released in March 2012 and added PCIe 3.0 support.

First generation modules are not compatible with second generation (MXM 3) modules and vice versa. First generation modules I to IV are fully backwards compatible.

Some MXM cards have different mounting screw hole configurations, always check the mounting holes of the MXM card and verify that they match those of the card you plan to upgrade to.

1st generation
MXM Type	Width	Length	Connector	Module Compatibility	Thermal Compatibility	Max. Power	Max. GPU size
MXM-I	70 mm	68 mm	Standard 230	I, II	I	18 W	35 × 35 mm
MXM-II	73 mm	78 mm	Standard 230	I, II	I, II	35 W	35 × 35 mm
MXM-III	82 mm	100 mm	Standard 230	I, II, III	III	45 W	40 x 40 mm
MXM-III	82 mm	100 mm	HE 232	I, II, III, III (HE)	III, III (HE)	75 W	40 x 40 mm
MXM-IV*	82 mm	117 mm	HE 232	I, II, III, III (HE), IV	III, III (HE), IV	75 W	40 x 40 mm

*Deprecated/abandoned, became/replaced by MXM-III (HE)

2nd generation (MXM 3)
MXM Type	Width	Length	Module Compatibility	Thermal Compatibility	Max. Slot Power	GPU memory bus
MXM-A	82 mm	70 mm	A	A	55 W	64-bit or 128-bit
MXM-B	82 mm	105 mm	A, B	A, B	200 W*	256-bit
MXM-B+	Not Public	Not Public	Not Public	Not Public	Not Public	256-bit

*Although the slot can deliver 200 watts, it will run dangerously hot, separate power cable always used at high wattages.

== Specification ==
MXM is no longer freely supplied by Nvidia but it is controlled by the MXM-SIG controlled by Nvidia. Only corporate clients are granted access to the standard. The MXM 2.1 specification is widely available.

== List of MXM cards ==
=== First generation MXM cards ===
Vendor	Name	Released	MXM Type	GPU	Architecture	Core config	TFLOPS (FP32)	TDP	Dimensions
AMD	Radeon HD 6530M	2010-11	MXM-II	Capilano	TeraScale 2	400:20:8	0.36	26 W	73 x 78 mm
AMD	Radeon HD 6550M	2010-11	MXM-II	Capilano	TeraScale 2	400:20:8	0.48	26 W	73 x 78 mm
AMD	Radeon HD 6550M	2010-11	MXM-II	Lexington	TeraScale 2	400:20:8	0.52	26 W	73 x 78 mm
AMD	Radeon HD 6570M	2010-11	MXM-II	Capilano	TeraScale 2	400:20:8	0.52	30 W	73 x 78 mm
ATI	Mobility Radeon X1800	2006-03	MXM-III	M58	Ultra-Threaded SE	12:8:12:12			82 x 100 mm
ATI	Mobility Radeon X1900	2007-01	MXM-III	M68	Ultra-Threaded SE	36:8:12:12			82 x 100 mm
ATI	Mobility Radeon HD 2600	2007-05	MXM-II	M76	TeraScale	120:8:4	0.12		73 x 78 mm
ATI	Mobility Radeon HD 2600 XT	2007-05	MXM-II	M76	TeraScale	120:8:4	0.16		73 x 78 mm
ATI	Radeon E2400	2007-06	MXM-II	RV610	TeraScale	40:4:4	0.05	25 W	73 x 78 mm
ATI	Mobility Radeon HD 2700	2007-07	MXM-II	M76	TeraScale	120:8:4	0.16	35 W	73 x 78 mm
ATI	Mobility Radeon HD 3670	2008-01	MXM-II	M86	TeraScale	120:8:4	0.16	30 W	73 x 78 mm
ATI	Mobility Radeon HD 3650	2008-01	MXM-II	M86	TeraScale	120:8:4	0.12		73 x 78 mm
ATI	Mobility Radeon HD 3470	2008-01	MXM-II	M82	TeraScale	40:4:4	0.05		73 x 78 mm
ATI	Mobility Radeon HD 3450	2008-01	MXM-II	M82	TeraScale	40:4:4	0.04		73 x 78 mm
ATI	Mobility Radeon HD 3430	2008-07	MXM-II	M82	TeraScale	40:4:4	0.04	12 W	73 x 78 mm
ATI	Mobility Radeon HD 3410	2008-07	MXM-II	M82	TeraScale	40:4:4	0.03	7 W	73 x 78 mm
ATI	Mobility Radeon HD 4570	2009-01	MXM-II	M92	TeraScale	80:8:4	0.11		73 x 78 mm
ATI	Mobility Radeon HD 4530	2009-01	MXM-II	M92	TeraScale	80:8:4	0.08		73 x 78 mm
ATI	Radeon E4690 MXM	2009-06	MXM-II	M96	TeraScale	320:32:8	0.38	30 W	73 x 78 mm
ATI	Mobility Radeon HD 4550	2010	MXM-II	M93	TeraScale	80:8:4	0.09		73 x 78 mm
Nvidia	GeForce Go 6600 NPB 128M	2005-09	MXM-I	NV43	Curie	8:3:8:4			70 x 68 mm
Nvidia	GeForce 8400M GS	2007-05	MXM-I	G86S	Tesla	16:8:4	0.03	11 W	70 x 68 mm
Nvidia	GeForce 9300M GS	2008-06	MXM-I	G98S	Tesla	8:4:4	0.02	13 W	70 x 68 mm
Nvidia	Quadro NVS 150M	2008-08	MXM-I	G98S	Tesla	8:4:4	0.02	10 W	70 x 68 mm
Nvidia	Quadro NVS 160M	2008-08	MXM-I	G98S	Tesla	8:4:4	0.02	12 W	70 x 68 mm
Nvidia	Quadro FX Go 540	2004-08	MXM-II	NV43	Curie	4:3:8:4		25 W	73 x 78 mm
Nvidia	GeForce Go 6600	2005-09	MXM-II	NV43	Curie	8:3:8:4			73 x 78 mm
Nvidia	Quadro FX 1500M	2006-04	MXM-III	G71	Curie	20:7:20:16		45 W	82 x 100 mm
Nvidia	GeForce Go 7900 GS	2006-04	MXM-II	G71	Curie	20:7:20:16		20 W	73 x 78 mm
Nvidia	GeForce 8600M GS	2006-05	MXM-II	G86	Tesla	16:8:4	0.03	20 W	73 x 78 mm
Nvidia	GeForce 8600M GT	2006-05	MXM-II	G84	Tesla	32:16:8	0.06	20 W	73 x 78 mm
Nvidia	GeForce 9600M GS	2008-06	MXM-II	G96C	Tesla	32:16:8	0.07	20 W	73 x 78 mm
Nvidia	GeForce 9600M GT	2008-06	MXM-II	G96C	Tesla	32:16:8	0.08	23 W	73 x 78 mm
Nvidia	GeForce 9700M GT	2008-07	MXM-II	G96	Tesla	32:16:8	0.1	45 W	73 x 78 mm
Nvidia	GeForce 9650M GT	2008-08	MXM-II	G96C	Tesla	32:16:8	0.09	23 W	OEM Custom
Nvidia	Quadro FX 370M	2008-08	MXM-II	G98S	Tesla	8:4:4	0.02	20 W	73 x 78 mm
Nvidia	Quadro FX 770M	2008-08	MXM-II	G96	Tesla	32:16:8	0.08	35 W	73 x 78 mm
Nvidia	Quadro FX 1700M	2008-10	MXM-II	G96	Tesla	32:16:8	0.1	45 W	73 x 78 mm
Nvidia	GeForce GT 220M	2009-06	MXM-II	G96C	Tesla	32:16:8	0.09	14 W	73 x 78 mm
Nvidia	GeForce GT 320M	2009-06	MXM-II	GT216	Tesla 2.0	32:16:8	0.05	23 W	73 x 78 mm
Nvidia	GeForce GTS 350M	2010-01	MXM-II	GT215	Tesla 2.0	96:32:8	0.21	28 W	OEM Custom
Nvidia	GeForce GTS 360M	2010-01	MXM-II	GT215	Tesla 2.0	96:32:8	0.25	38 W	OEM Custom
Nvidia	GeForce Go 6800	2004-11	MXM-III	NV41	Curie	12:5:12:8		45 W	82 x 100 mm
Nvidia	Quadro FX Go 1400	2005-02	MXM-III	NV41	Curie	8:5:8:8			82 x 100 mm
Nvidia	Quadro FX 2500M	2005-09	MXM-III	G71	Curie	24:8:24:16		45 W	82 x 100 mm
Nvidia	Quadro NVS 120M	2006-06	MXM-II	G72B	Curie	4:3:4:2		10 W	82 x 100 mm
Nvidia	GeForce Go 7950 GTX	2006-10	MXM-III	G71	Curie	24:8:24:16	0.14	45 W	82 x 100 mm
Nvidia	Quadro FX 3500M	2007-03	MXM-III	G71	Curie	24:8:24:16		45 W	82 x 100 mm
Nvidia	Quadro FX 1600M	2007-06	MXM-III (HE)	G84	Tesla	32:16:8	0.08	50 W	82 x 100 mm
Nvidia	GeForce 8700M GT	2007-06	MXM-III (HE)	G84	Tesla	32:16:8	0.08	29 W	82 x 100 mm
Nvidia	Quadro NVS 320M	2007-06	MXM-III (HE)	G84	Tesla	32:16:8	0.07	20 W	82 x 100 mm
Nvidia	GeForce 8800M GTS	2007-11	MXM-III (HE)	G92	Tesla	64:32:16	0.16	50 W	82 x 100 mm
Nvidia	GeForce 8800M GTX	2007-11	MXM-III (HE)	G92	Tesla	96:48:16	0.24	65 W	82 x 100 mm
Nvidia	Quadro FX 3600M	2008-02	MXM-III (HE)	G92	Tesla	64:32:16	0.16	70 W	82 x 100 mm
Nvidia	Quadro FX 3600M	2008-02	MXM-III (HE)	G92	Tesla	96:48:16	0.16	70 W	82 x 100 mm
Nvidia	Quadro FX 2700M	2008-08	MXM-III (HE)	G94	Tesla	48:24:16	0.13	65 W	82 x 100 mm
Nvidia	GeForce 9800M GTS	2008-08	MXM-III (HE)	G94	Tesla	64:32:16	0.19	75 W	82 x 100 mm
Nvidia	Quadro FX 3700M	2008-08	MXM-III (HE)	G92	Tesla	128:64:16	0.35	75 W	82 x 100 mm
Nvidia	GeForce 9800M GT	2008-07	MXM-III (HE)	G92	Tesla	96:48:16	0.24	65 W	82 x 100 mm
Nvidia	GeForce 9800M GTX	2008-07	MXM-III (HE)	G92	Tesla	112:56:16	0.28	75 W	82 x 100 mm
Nvidia	GeForce GTX 280M	2009-03	MXM-III (HE)	G92	Tesla	128:64:16	0.38	75 W	82 x 100 mm
Nvidia	GeForce Go 7950 GTX	2006-10	MXM-IV	G71	Curie	24:8:24:16	0.14	45 W	82 x 117 mm

=== Second generation MXM cards ===
Vendor	Name	Released	MXM Type	GPU	Architecture	Core config (Note: Unified Shaders : Texture Mapping Units : Render Output Units)	TFLOPS (FP32)	TDP	Dimensions
AMD	FirePro M5800	2010-03	Type-A	Madison XT	Terascale 2	400:20:8	0.52	26 W	80 × 70 mm
AMD	FirePro M5950	2011-01	Type-A	Whistler XT	Terascale 2	480:24:8	0.69	35 W	80 × 70 mm
AMD	FirePro M4000	2012-06	Type-A	Chelsea XT GL	GCN 1	512:32:16	0.69	33 W	80 × 70 mm
AMD	FirePro M5100	2013-10	Type-A	Venus XT	GCN 1	640:40:16	1.0	45 W	80 × 70 mm
AMD	FirePro M6100	2013-10	Type-B	Saturn XT GL	GCN 2	768:48:16	1.7	100 W	82 × 105 mm
AMD	FirePro W5130M	2014-08	Type-A	Tropo LE	GCN 1	512:32:16	1.0	35 W	80 × 70 mm
AMD	FirePro W5170M	2014-08	Type-A	Tropo XT	GCN 1	640:40:16	1.1	45 W	80 × 70 mm
AMD	FirePro W6150M	2015-11	Type-B	Saturn XT GL	GCN 2	768:48:16	2.0	100 W	82 × 105 mm
AMD	FirePro S4000X	2014-08	Type-A	Venus XT	GCN 1	640:40:16	1.0	45 W	80 × 70 mm
AMD	FirePro S7100X	2016-05	Type-B	Amethyst XT	GCN 3	2048:128:32	3.0	100 W	82 × 105 mm
AMD	Radeon Pro WX 4130 Mobile	2017-03	Type-A	Baffin LE	GCN 4	640:40:16	1.4	45 W	82 × 70 mm
AMD	Radeon Pro WX 4150 Mobile	2017-03	Type-A	Baffin PRO	GCN 4	896:56:16	1.9	45 W	82 × 70 mm
AMD	Radeon Pro WX 4170 Mobile	2017-03	Type-B	Baffin XT	GCN 4	1024:64:16	2.5	60 W	82 × 105 mm
AMD	Radeon Embedded E6465	2015-10	Type-A	Caicos	TeraScale 2	60:8:4	0.2	28 W	80 × 70 mm
AMD	Radeon Embedded E8860	2015-10	Type-A	Cape Verde XT	GCN 1	640:40:16	0.8	37 W	80 × 70 mm
AMD	Radeon Embedded E8870	2015-10	Type-B	Bonaire Pro	GCN 2	768:48:16	1.4	75 W	82 × 105 mm
AMD	Radeon Embedded E8950	2015-10	Type-B	Tonga XT	GCN 3	2048:128:32	3.0	95 W	82 × 105 mm
AMD	Radeon Embedded E9172	2017-10	Type-A	Polaris 12 (Lexa)	GCN 4	512:32:16	1.2	35 W	82 × 70 mm
AMD	Radeon Embedded E9174	2017-10	Type-A	Polaris 12 (Lexa)	GCN 4	512:32:16	1.2	50 W	82 × 70 mm
AMD	Radeon Embedded E9260	2016-09	Type-A	Baffin PRO	GCN 4	896:56:16	2.2	50 W	82 × 70 mm
AMD	Radeon Embedded E9550	2016-09	Type-B	Ellesmere XT	GCN 4	2304:144:32	5.8	95 W	82 × 105 mm
AMD	Radeon RX 550 512SP	2017-10	Type-A	Baffin	GCN 4	512:32:16	1.1	50 W	82 x 70 mm
AMD	Radeon RX 580 2048SP	2018-10	Type-B	Polaris 20	GCN 4	2048:144:32	5.3	120 W	82 x 105 mm
AMD	Radeon RX 580	2017-04	Type-B	Polaris 20	GCN 4	2304:144:32	6.2	120 W	82 x 105 mm
AMD	Radeon RX 5500 XT	2019-12	Type-B	Navi 14	RDNA 1	1408:88:32	5.2	105 W	82 x 105 mm
AMD	Radeon RX 6600	2021-10	Type-B	Navi 23	RDNA 2	1792:112:64	8.9	132 W	82 x 105 mm
AMD	Radeon RX 6600 XT	2021-07	Type-B	Navi 23	RDNA 2	2048:128:64	10.6	160 W	82 x 105 mm
Intel	MXM-AXe (Arc A350E)	2022-03	Type-A	DG2-128	Generation 12.7	768:48:24	3.4	25 W	82 x 70 mm
Intel	MXM-AXe (Arc A370E )	2022-03	Type-A	DG2-128	Generation 12.7	1024:64:32	4.2	35 W	82 x 70 mm
Intel	Arc A350M	2022-03	Type-A	DG2-128	Generation 12.7	768:48:24	3.4	25 W	82 x 70 mm
Intel	Arc A370M	2022-03	Type-A	DG2-128	Generation 12.7	1024:64:32	4.2	35 W	82 x 70 mm
Intel	Arc A380M	2023-01	Type-A	DG2-128	Generation 12.7	1024:64:32	4.1	35 W	82 x 70 mm
Intel	Arc A530M	2023-08	Type-B	DG2-256	Generation 12.7	1536:96:48	4.0	95 W	82 × 105 mm
Intel	Arc A570M	2023-08	Type-B	DG2-256	Generation 12.7	2048:128:64	5.3	95 W	82 × 105 mm
Intel	Arc A730M	2022	Type-B	DG2-512	Generation 12.7	3072:192:96	12.6	120 W	82 × 105 mm
Intel	Arc A770M	2022	Type-B	DG2-512	Generation 12.7	4096:256:128	13.5	150 W	82 × 105 mm
Nvidia	Tesla M6	2015-11	Type-B	GM204	Maxwell 2.0	1536:96:48	3.0	100 W	82 × 105 mm
Nvidia	Quadro K610 Mobile	2013-07	Type-A	GK208	Kepler	192:16:8	0.4	30 W	80 × 70 mm
Nvidia	Quadro K1100 Mobile	2013-07	Type-A	GK107	Kepler	384:32:16	0.5	45 W	80 × 70 mm
Nvidia	Quadro K2100 Mobile	2013-07	Type-A	GK106	Kepler	576:48:16	0.7	55 W	80 × 70 mm
Nvidia	Quadro K3100 Mobile	2013-07	Type-B	GK104	Kepler	768:64:32	1.1	75 W	82 × 105 mm
Nvidia	Quadro K5100 Mobile	2013-07	Type-B	GK104	Kepler	1536:128:32	2.4	100 W	82 × 105 mm
Nvidia	Quadro M520 Mobile	2017-01	Type-A	GM108	Maxwell	384:16:8	0.8	25 W	80 × 70 mm
Nvidia	Quadro M620 Mobile	2017-01	Type-A	GM107	Maxwell	512:32:16	1.0	30 W	80 × 70 mm
Nvidia	Quadro M1000M Mobile	2015-08	Type-A	GM107	Maxwell	512:32:16	1.0	40 W	80 × 70 mm
Nvidia	Quadro M1200M Mobile	2017-01	Type-A	GM107	Maxwell	640:40:16	1.4	45 W	80 × 70 mm
Nvidia	Quadro M2000M Mobile	2015-12	Type-A	GM107	Maxwell	640:40:16	1.4	55 W	80 × 70 mm
Nvidia	Quadro M2200M Mobile	2017-01	Type-A	GM206	Maxwell 2.0	1024:64:32	2.1	55 W	80 × 70 mm
Nvidia	Quadro M3000M Mobile	2015-08	Type-B	GM204	Maxwell 2.0	1024:64:32	2.1	75 W	82 × 105 mm
Nvidia	Quadro M4000M Mobile	2015-08	Type-B	GM204	Maxwell 2.0	1280:80:64	2.5	100 W	82 × 105 mm
Nvidia	Quadro M5000M Mobile	2015-08	Type-B	GM204	Maxwell 2.0	1536:96:64	3.0	100 W	82 × 105 mm
Nvidia	Quadro P1000 Mobile	2017-02	Type-A	GP107	Pascal	512:32:16	1.6	40 W	80 × 70 mm
Nvidia	Quadro P2000 Mobile	2019-02	Type-A	GP106	Pascal	1152:72:32	3.0	75 W	80 × 70 mm
Nvidia	Quadro P3000 Mobile	2017-01	Type-B	GP104	Pascal	1280:80:32	3.1	75 W	82 × 105 mm
Nvidia	Quadro P3200 Mobile	2018-02	Type-B	GP104	Pascal	1792:112:64	5.5	75 W	82 × 105 mm
Nvidia	Quadro P4000 Mobile	2017-01	Type-B	GP104	Pascal	1792:112:64	4.4	100 W	82 × 105 mm
Nvidia	Quadro P4200 Mobile	2018-02	Type-B	GP104	Pascal	2304:144:64	7.6	100 W	82 × 105 mm
Nvidia	Quadro P5000 Mobile	2017-01	Type-B	GP104	Pascal	2048:128:64	6.2	100 W	82 × 105 mm
Nvidia	Quadro P5200 Mobile	2018-02	Type-B	GP104	Pascal	2560:160:64	8.9	100 W	82 × 105 mm
Nvidia	Quadro T1000 Mobile	2019-05	Type-A	TU117	Turing	896:56:32	2.6	50 W	82 × 70 mm
Nvidia	GeForce GTX 965M	2016-01	Type-A	GM204	Maxwell 2.0	1024:64:32	2.4	75 W	80 × 70 mm
Nvidia	GeForce GTX 965M	2014-10	Type-B	GM204	Maxwell 2.0	1024:64:32	2.4	75 W	82 × 105 mm
Nvidia	GeForce GTX 970M	2014-10	Type-B	GM204	Maxwell 2.0	1280:80:48	2.7	75 W	82 × 105 mm
Nvidia	GeForce GTX 980M	2014-10	Type-B	GM204	Maxwell 2.0	1536:96:64	3.2	100 W	82 × 105 mm
Nvidia	GeForce GTX 980MX	2016-06	Type-B	GM204	Maxwell 2.0	1664:104:64	3.9	148 W	83 × 115 mm
Nvidia	GeForce GTX 980	2015-09	Type-B	GM204	Maxwell 2.0	2048:128:64	4.7	200 W	102.6 × 115 mm
Nvidia	GeForce GTX 1050 Mobile	2017-01	Type-A	GP107	Pascal	640:60:16	1.9	75 W	82 × 70 mm
Nvidia	GeForce GTX 1050 Ti Mobile	2017-01	Type-A	GP107	Pascal	768:48:2	2.4	75 W	82 × 70 mm
Nvidia	GeForce GTX 1060 Mobile "P872L"	2017-05	Type-B	GP106	Pascal	1280:80:48	4.4	100 W	100 × 124 mm
Nvidia	GeForce GTX 1060 Mobile	2017-05	Type-B	GP106	Pascal	1280:80:48	4.3	78 W	82 × 105 mm
Nvidia	GeForce GTX 1070 Mobile "P872L"	2017-05	Type-B	GP104	Pascal	2048:128:64	6.7	150 W	100 × 124 mm
Nvidia	GeForce GTX 1070 Mobile	2017-05	Type-B	GP104	Pascal	2048:128:64	6.7	120 W	82 × 105 mm
Nvidia	GeForce GTX 1080 Mobile "P872L"	2017-05	Type-B	GP104	Pascal	2560:160:64	9.1	190 W	100 × 124 mm
Nvidia	GeForce GTX 1080 Mobile "P870L" (MSI GT73VR)	2017-05	Type-B	GP104	Pascal	2560:160:64	9.1	200 W	
Nvidia	GeForce GTX 1080 Mobile "V1.0" (MSI GT83)	2017-05	Type-B	GP104	Pascal	2560:160:64	9.1	150 W	94 × 105 mm
Nvidia	GeForce RTX 2060 Mobile (Clevo)	2019-01	Type-B	TU106	Turing	1920:120:48	4.6	80 W	100 × 124 mm
Nvidia	GeForce RTX 2070 Mobile (Clevo)	2019-01	Type-B	TU106	Turing	2304:144:64	6.6	115 W	100 × 124 mm
Nvidia	GeForce RTX 2080 Mobile (Clevo)	2019-01	Type-B	TU104	Turing	2944:184:64	9.4	150 W	100 × 124 mm
Nvidia	Quadro RTX 3000 Mobile	2019-05	Type-B	TU106	Turing	1920:120:64	5.3	80 W	82 × 105 mm
Nvidia	Quadro RTX 4000 Mobile	2019-05	Type-B	TU104	Turing	2560:160:64	8.0	110 W	82 × 105 mm
Nvidia	Quadro RTX 5000 Mobile	2019-05	Type-B	TU104	Turing	3072:192:64	10.9	110 W	82 × 105 mm
Nvidia	GeForce RTX 3050 Mobile	2021-05	Type-B	GA107	Ampere	2048:64:32	5.5	85 W	82 x 105 mm
Nvidia	GeForce RTX 3050 Ti Mobile	2021-05	Type-B	GA107	Ampere	2560:80:32	5.3	85 W	82 x 105 mm
Nvidia	GeForce RTX 3050 8GB	2022-01	Type-B	GA106	Ampere	2560:80:32	9.1	90 W	82 x 105 mm
Nvidia	GeForce RTX 3060 Mobile	2021-01	Type-B	GA106	Ampere	3840:120:48	10.9	135 W	82 x 105 mm
Nvidia	GeForce RTX 3060 12GB	2021-01	Type-B	GA106	Ampere	3584:112:48	12.7	90 W	82 x 105 mm
Nvidia	GeForce RTX 3070 Mobile	2021-01	Type-B	GA104	Ampere	5120:160:80	16.0	150 W	82 x 105 mm
Nvidia	GeForce RTX 3070 Ti Mobile	2022-01	Type-B	GA104	Ampere	5888:184:96	16.6	150 W	82 x 105 mm
Nvidia	GeForce RTX 3080 Mobile	2021-01	Type-B	GA104	Ampere	6144:192:96	19.0	150 W	82 x 105 mm
Nvidia	Quadro RTX A3000	2021-04	Type-B	GA104	Ampere	4096:128:64	11.8	95 W	82 x 105 mm
Nvidia	GeForce RTX 4050 Mobile	2023-01	Type-A	AD107	Ada Lovelace	2560:80:48	9.0	100 W	82 x 70 mm
Nvidia	GeForce RTX 4060 Mobile	2023-01	Type-A	AD107	Ada Lovelace	3072:96:48	11.6	110 W	82 x 70 mm
Nvidia	GeFroce RTX 4070 Mobile	2023-01	Type-A	AD106	Ada Lovelace	4608:144:48	15.6	110 W	82 x 70 mm
Nvidia	GeForce RTX 4080 Mobile	2023-01	Type-B	AD104	Ada Lovelace	7424:232:80	24.7	130 W	82 x 105 mm
Nvidia	GeForce RTX 4090 Mobile	2023-01	Type-B	AD103	Ada Lovelace	9728:304:112	33	135 W	82 x 105 mm

== Other uses ==
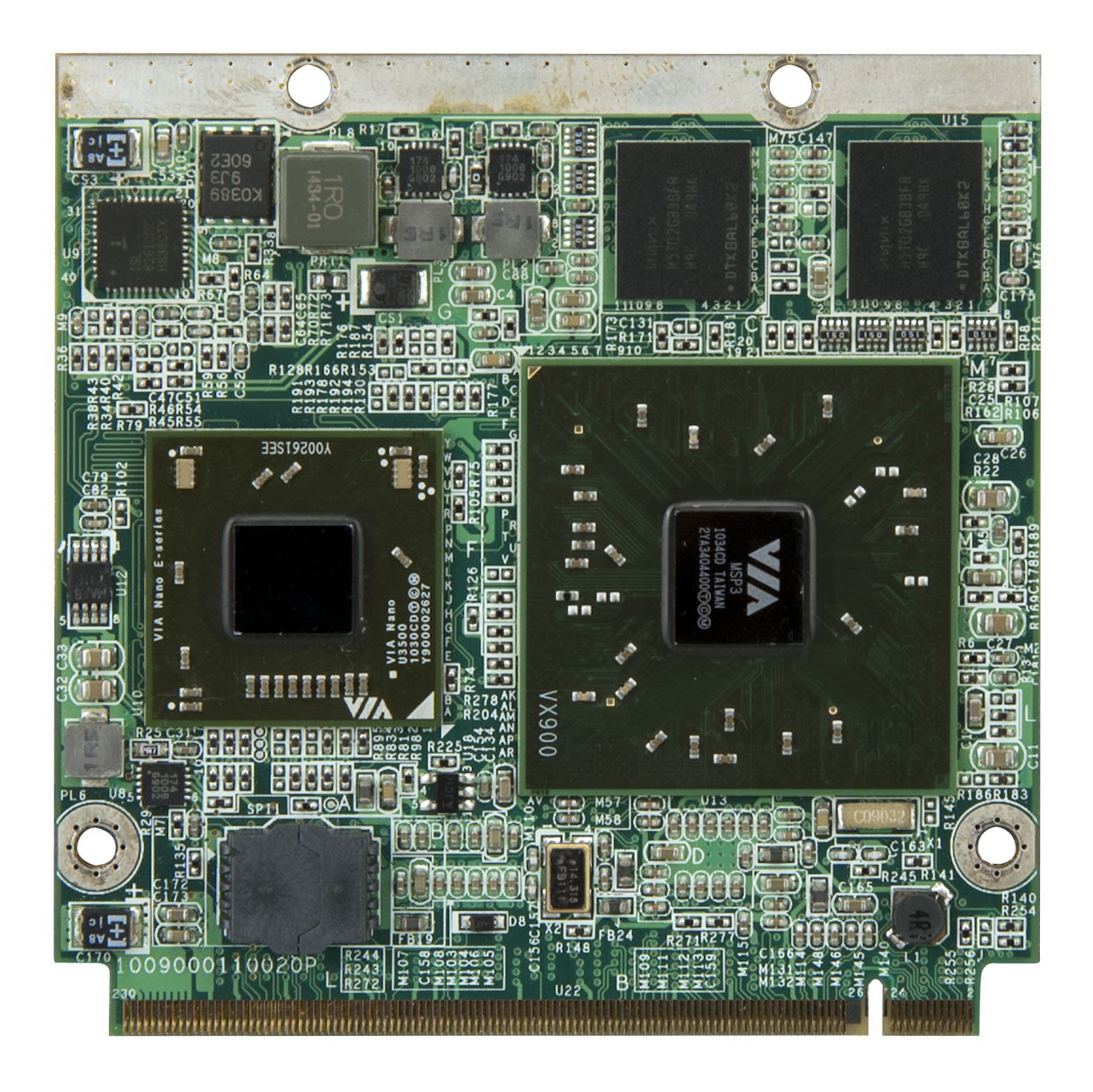
VIA QSM-8Q90 Qseven computer-on-module using a MXM-2 connector

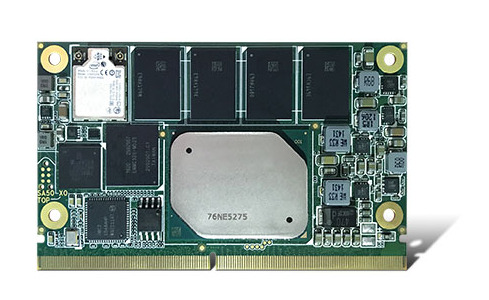
Congatec SMARC computer-on-module using MXM-3 connector

The Qseven computer-on-module form factor uses a MXM-II connector, while the SMARC computer-on-module form factor uses a MXM 3 connector. Both implementations are not in any way compatible with the MXM standard.
