= Smart Mobility Architecture =

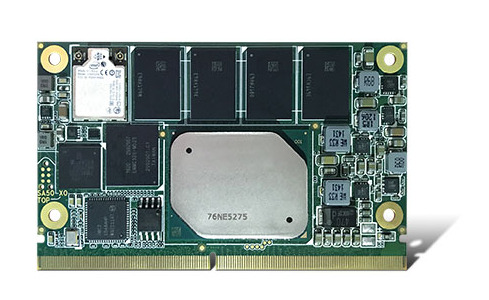
Congatec SMARC module

Smart Mobility Architecture (SMARC) is a computer hardware standard for computer-on-modules (COMs). SMARC modules are specifically designed for the development of extremely compact low-power systems, such as mobile devices.

== Specification ==
The SMARC hardware specification V1.0 was published by the Standardization Group for Embedded Technologies (SGeT). SGeT had its first meeting in 2012, headed by Engelbert Hörmannsdorfer. The specification is freely available as a download on the SGeT website. Generally, SMARC modules are based on ARM architecture processors, they can, however, also be fitted with other low-power system on a chip (SoC) architectures, like, for example, ones based on x86 processors. Typically, SMARC modules' power requirement is in the range of a few watts.

Computer-on-modules integrate the core function of a bootable computer, as well as additional circuitry, including DRAM, boot-flash, voltage distribution, Ethernet and display transmitter. The modules are deployed together with an application-specific carrier board, whose size and form can be defined to meet customer-specific requirements. The carrier board executes the required interfaces and can integrate, if required, any further functionalities, such as audio codecs, touch controller, wireless communication interfaces, etc.

The SMARC specification outlines both the dimensions of the module and the positioning of the anchor points as well as the connector to the carrier board and the executed interfaces with the pin-out. The pin-out is optimized for ARM and low-power SoC interfaces and is distinguished from classical PC interfaces by its target-oriented focus on low-power and mobile applications.

SMARC is based on the ultra-low power (ULP-COM) form factor which was introduced by the companies Kontron and Adlink in February 2012. During the specification process by the SGeT the standard was renamed to SMARC. SGET approved the 1.0 specification in December 2012.

SMARC Evolution and Adoption

Over time, the SMARC (Smart Mobility ARChitecture) standard has evolved, with the latest version being 2.x. Initially, the standard was primarily supported by companies such as Kontron and Adlink. However, the adoption of SMARC modules has grown significantly, with additional providers entering the market. Notable companies now offering SMARC modules include Toradex, alongside the original pioneers, Kontron and Adlink

=== Dimensions ===
SMARC defines two module sizes:

- 82 mm × 50 mm for extremely compact low-power designs
- 82 mm × 80 mm for SoCs with higher performance and with increased space and cooling requirement

=== Connector ===
SMARC Computer-on-Modules have 314 card edge contacts on the printed circuit board (PCB) of the module which is plugged via a low-profile connector on the carrier board. In most cases, the connector has a construction height of 4.3 mm. It is also used for Mobile PCI Express Module 3.0 graphic cards, which naturally have completely different pin assignments.

=== Signal lines and pin assignments ===
Signal transmission is carried out via a total of 314 pins. 33 of these are reserved signal lines for power supply and grounding, so that with SMARC a total of 281 signal lines are effectively available. ARM- and SoC-typical energy-saving interfaces, like, for instance, parallel LCD for display connection, mobile industry processor interfaces for cameras, Serial Peripheral Interface (SPI) for general peripheral connection, I²S for audio and I2C are included. Besides these, classical computer interfaces such as USB, SATA and PCI Express are also defined.

In the 2.0 version of the SMARC specification not all of the 314 signal lines are assigned to fixed I/Os. The Alternate Function Block (AFB) has free pins available for different requirements. This is to ensure that the SMARC specification can flexibly accommodate up and coming technical developments which today are not foreseeable while remaining fully compatibility to previous designs. On the one hand, extended versions of the SMARC specification can assign new standard functions to these 20 AFB signal lines. On the other hand, the SMARC specification 1.0 lists the Media Oriented System Transport (MOST) bus, dual Gigabit Ethernet, Super Speed USB, or industrial network protocols which could be imagined as or might be assigned as interfaces of the AFB.

== See also ==
- COM Express, another standard for computer-on-modules
- ETX
- Qseven
- XTX
