= ESMexpress =

ESMexpress is a computer-on-module (COM) standard. It is a complete processor module that currently supports several low-power Intel and PowerPC platforms. Every module has a CPU, as well as memory and a range of serial communication interfaces such as PCI Express, Gigabit Ethernet, USB, SATA, SDVO, LVDS and HD audio. These interfaces are defined in the form factor's specification, and signals are assigned to two 120-pin connectors. This fixed pin mapping ensures that different ESMexpress modules can be exchanged more easily. Consequently, ESMexpress typically does not have an onboard FPGA. The idea behind this is to implement very specialized functions in an FPGA on the COM's carrier board to ease upgrades of the system CPU through exchange of the ESMexpress module.

The ESMexpress standard includes only one form factor: 95 x 125 mm. The most important specialty of this computer-on-module is its surrounding mechanical concept, which was designed for especially severe environmental conditions, for example in railway or avionics, or in the automation industry. The large temperature ranges prevalent in such fields of use are met by the modules through a cooling concept that does not need a fan for the CPU: the computer board is embedded into an aluminum frame and cover that can lead the heat off the processor by conduction cooling. At the same time this mechanical set-up provides stability to withstand vibration, but also electromagnetic compatibility (EMC).

== Standardization ==
ESMexpress was undergoing a standardization process managed by the VITA organization to become a standard called 'ANSI/VITA 59 RSE Rugged System-On-Module Express'. For companies that need robust electronic products, both the reduction of development times and a long-term availability of more than 10 or 15 years are significant factors for a new computer-on-module standard like ESMexpress. However, ESMexpress had been based on the existing, popular COM Express, and during the standardization process the work group decided to make better use of this industry popularity. In 2013 the standard's designation was changed into 'VITA 59.00 Rugged COM Express (RCE)'. The specification was completely reviewed but kept the mechanical framework of ESMexpress. The concept now defines the mechanical design to convert standard PICMG COM.0 COM Express CPU boards into VITA 59 Rugged COM Express boards. Although not becoming an official standard, the concept of ESMexpress remains as originally specified and can be regarded a more robust variety of Rugged COM Express, primarily because of the rugged board-to-board connectors.

== ESMini ==
ESMini is a derivative of ESMexpress. It is based on the same mechanical concept: the computer board is also embedded into an aluminum frame and cover for conduction cooling and EMC protection, and its board-to-board connector types are identical with ESMexpress. The most important difference to ESMexpress is its small size: it is only 95 by 55 mm. Another difference is that it allows greater variations and design flexibility than ESMexpress. Its pin-out is not standardized and the board may include an FPGA which can be used to implement additional interfaces that are not integrated into the onboard processor's chip set.

== See also ==
- COM Express
