= ETX (form factor) =

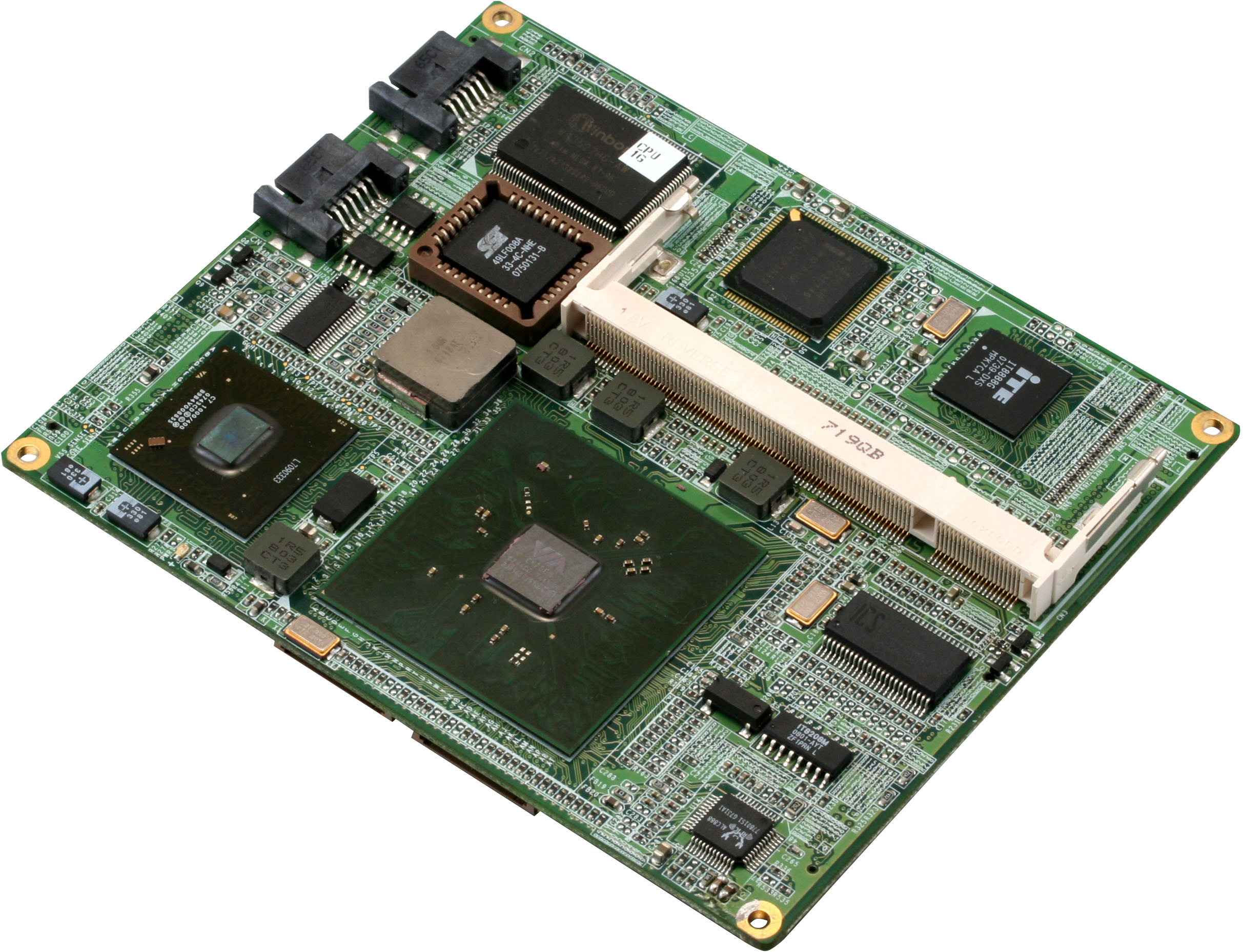
ETX module CX700M from Aaeon

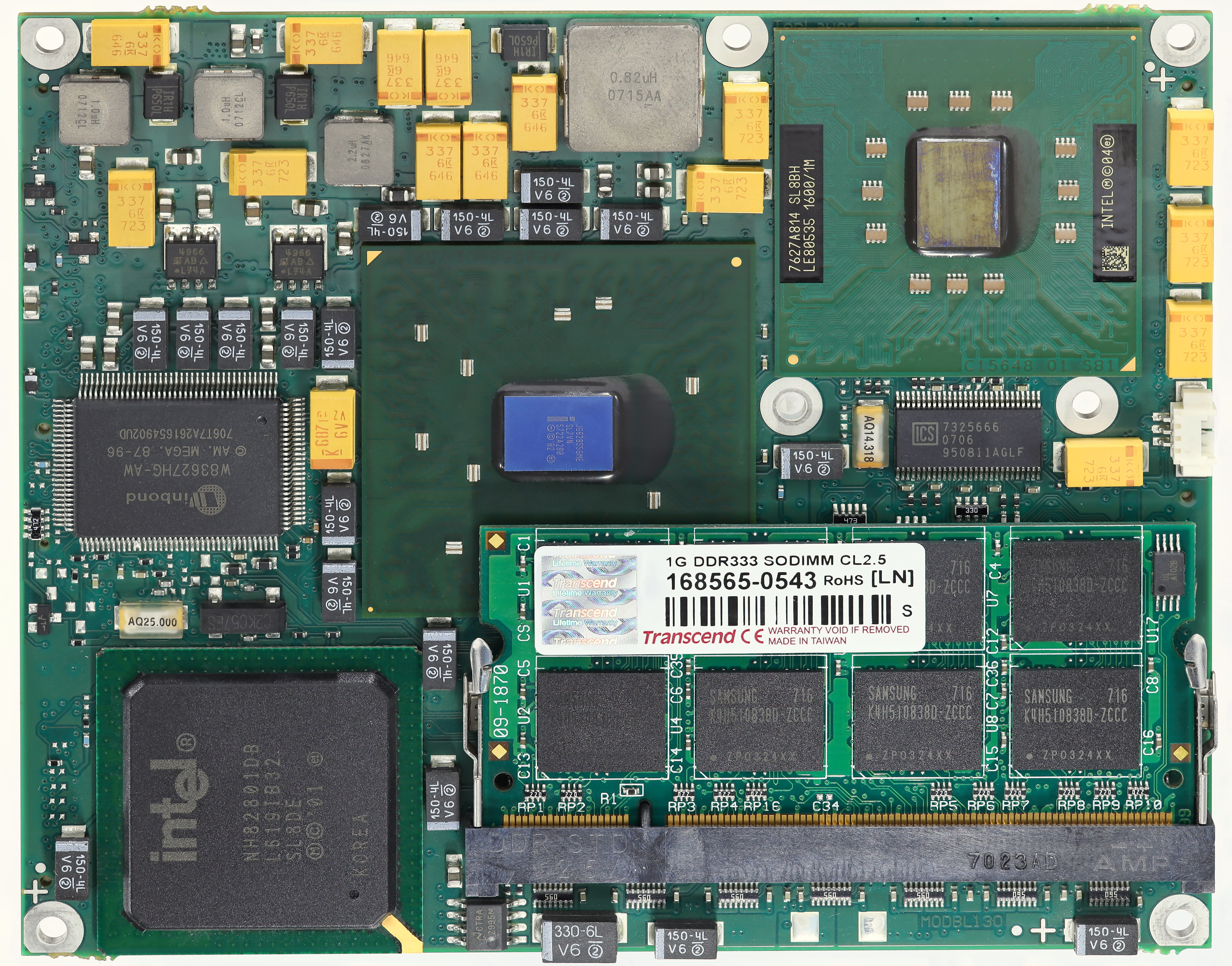
Kontron ETX-PM16 top view

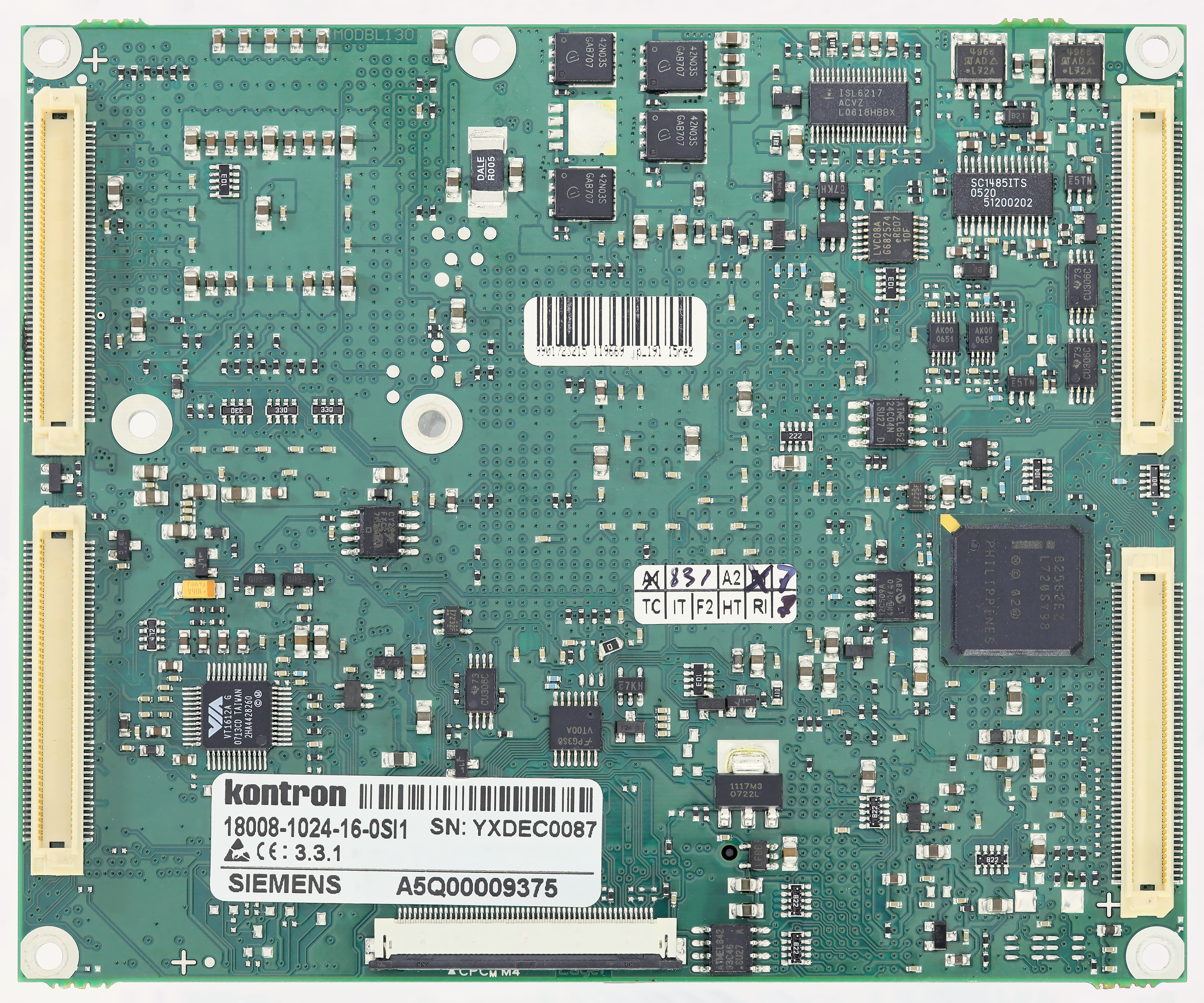
Kontron ETX-PM16 bottom view with connectors

ETX, standing for Embedded Technology eXtended, is an integrated and compact 95 × 125 mm (3.7 × 4.9 in) computer-on-module (COM) form factor, which can be used in a design application much like an integrated circuit component. Each ETX COM integrates core CPU and memory functionality, the common I/O of a PC/AT (serial, parallel, etc.), USB, audio, graphics, and Ethernet. All I/O signals as well as a full implementation of ISA and PCI buses are mapped to four high-density, low-profile connectors on the bottom side of the module.

ETX boards are available with AMD Geode, VIA, Intel Atom, Pentium, Celeron and Core Duo processors.

XTX offers a 75% pin-compatible upgrade path to ETX standard. XTX drops the ISA bus and adds PCI-Express, SATA, and LPC.

COM Express was released in 2005 from PICMG.

== History ==
The Embedded Technology eXtended (ETX) specification, first developed by Kontron (formerly *JUMPtec) in early 2000.

In April 2006, the members of the ETX Industrial Group released the next generation of the ETX 3.0 specification. The ETX Industrial Group is an independent association of companies that work to exchange knowledge about ETX. Membership is open to companies which develop and produce ETX modules. Members include Kontron Embedded Modules GmbH, congatec AG, Advantech, MSC Vertriebs GmbH, ADLINK Technology Inc., Avalue Technology Inc., SECO Srl, Arbor Technology Corp., Axiomtek Co., Blue Chip Technology, AAEON Technology Inc., AEWIN Technologies IBase, Honeywell – CMSS and Portwell.

=== 3.0 specification ===
The ETX 3.0 Specification is compact form factor, 95 × 114 mm (3.7 × 4.4 inches) in size. It extends the original ETX standard and adds two Serial ATA (SATA) interfaces. This is done without changing any of the ETX pin designations, making new modules pin-to-pin compatible with previous versions.

Modules designed according to the ETX 3.0 specification integrate two SATA ports via two slim line connectors designed onto the top side of the CPU Module in the vicinity of X4. The module or carrier board ETX connectors do not require any changes to use the faster SATA hard drives.

	ETX	XTX	COM Express (Type 2)
Dimensions	95 × 114 mm (3.7 × 4.5 in)	95 × 114 mm (3.7 × 4.5 in) (ETX footprint)	110 × 155 mm (4.3 × 6.1 in) (extended); 95 × 125 mm (3.7 × 4.9 in) (basic); 95 × 95 mm (3.7 × 3.7 in) (compact); 55 × 84 mm (2.2 × 3.3 in) (mini)
Legacy^{1} support	Full legacy	Legacy except ISA	Legacy except ISA
PCI Express support	-	4 Lanes	up to 6 Lanes (basic)
PCI Express Graphic support	-	-	up to 16 Lanes
Ethernet support	10/100	10/100	10/100/1000
IDE support	2 IDE, 2 SATA^{2}	2 IDE, 4 SATA	IDE, 4 SATA
LPC support	-	yes	yes
USB support	4 USB	6 USB	8 USB
Audio support	Line In/Out, Mic	AC'97, Line In/Out, Mic	AC'97, Line In/Out, Mic, AC'97 digital, HDA
Power	5V, 5VSB	5V, 5VSB	12V, 5VSB
Notes: 1. "Legacy" is defined as the older PC peripherals and bus, such as ISA bus, RS-232 serial, IEEE 1284 parallel, floppy, and PS/2 keyboard & mouse.; 2. ETX 3.0 adds SATA via a topside connector on the board.

Mandatory features:

- Connector X1: PCI bus, USB Audio
- Connector X2: ISA bus
- Connector X3: VGA, LCD, Video, COM 1, COM2, LPT/Floppy, IrDA, Mouse, Keyboard
- Connector X4: IDE 1, IDE 2, Ethernet, miscellaneous
- SATA: Two ports via connector on the top side (as of version 3.0)
