= XTX =

XTX is a computer-on-module (COM) standard for x86-based embedded devices. XTX adds PCI-Express, SATA, and LPC capabilities. The standard was promulgated by Advantech Corporation, Ampro, and Congatec.

	ETX	XTX	COM Express (Type 2)
Dimensions	95 × 114 mm (3.7 × 4.5 in)	95 × 114 mm (3.7 × 4.5 in) (ETX footprint)	110 × 155 mm (4.3 × 6.1 in) (extended); 95 × 125 mm (3.7 × 4.9 in) (basic); 95 × 95 mm (3.7 × 3.7 in) (compact); 55 × 84 mm (2.2 × 3.3 in) (mini)
Legacy^{1} support	Full legacy	Legacy except ISA	Legacy except ISA
PCI Express support	-	4 Lanes	up to 6 Lanes (basic)
PCI Express Graphic support	-	-	up to 16 Lanes
Ethernet support	10/100	10/100	10/100/1000
IDE support	2 IDE, 2 SATA^{2}	2 IDE, 4 SATA	IDE, 4 SATA
LPC support	-	yes	yes
USB support	4 USB	6 USB	8 USB
Audio support	Line In/Out, Mic	AC'97, Line In/Out, Mic	AC'97, Line In/Out, Mic, AC'97 digital, HDA
Power	5V, 5VSB	5V, 5VSB	12V, 5VSB
Notes: 1. "Legacy" is defined as the older PC peripherals and bus, such as ISA bus, RS-232 serial, IEEE 1284 parallel, floppy, and PS/2 keyboard & mouse.; 2. ETX 3.0 adds SATA via a topside connector on the board.
