= Computer-on-module =

Type of single-board computer

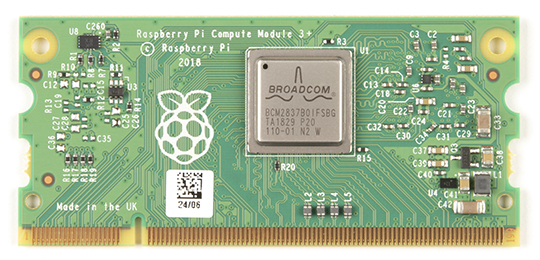
Raspberry Pi Compute Module 3+, a computer-on-module, which offers a quad-core CPU, 1 GB RAM, and up to 32 GB of flash storage in the compact SO-DIMM form factor used for RAM modules on laptops.

A computer-on-module (COM) is a type of single-board computer (SBC), a subtype of an embedded computer system. An extension of the concept of system on chip (SoC) and system in package (SiP), COM lies between a full-up computer and a microcontroller in nature. It is very similar to a system on module (SOM).

== Design ==
COMs are complete embedded computers built on a single circuit board. The design is centered on a microprocessor with RAM, input/output controllers and all other features needed to be a functional computer on the one board. However, unlike a single-board computer, the COM usually lacks the standard connectors for any input/output peripherals to be attached directly to the board.

The module usually needs to be mounted on a carrier board (or "baseboard") which breaks the bus out to standard peripheral connectors. Some COMs also include peripheral connectors. Some can be used without a carrier.

A COM solution offers a dense package computer system for use in small or specialized applications requiring low power consumption or small physical size as is needed in embedded systems. As a COM is very compact and highly integrated, even complex CPUs, including multi-core technology, can be realized on a COM.

Some devices also incorporate field-programmable gate array (FPGA) components. FPGA-based functions can be added as IP cores to the COM itself or to the carrier card. Using FPGA IP cores adds to the modularity of a COM concept because I/O functions can be adapted to special needs without extensive rewiring on the printed circuit board.

A "computer-on-module" is also called a "system-on-module" (SOM).

== History ==
The terms "Computer-on-Module" and "COM" were coined by VDC Research Group, Inc. (formerly Venture Development Corporation) to describe this class of embedded computer boards.

Dr. Gordon Kruberg, founder and CEO of Gumstix, is credited for creating the first COM, predating the next recognizable COM entries by almost 18 months.

Gumstix ARM Linux Machine number is 373, established 9 September 2003, while Kontron's is 735, established 18 April 2005, and Keith & Koep's (now part of SECO) is 776, established 20 June 2005. Boards numbered below 373 were larger and single board computers as opposed to modules, for example, the Itsy, a tiny hand-held device based on the StrongARM.

The rapid development paradigm (COM + expansion board) Dr. Kruberg established has been at the heart of leading edge development since then and used at leading consumer products companies worldwide.

COM's have proven useful in launching entire industries requiring rapid development efforts. For example, in 2005 Apple used a Gumstix COM to test the original iPhone concept.

== Benefits ==
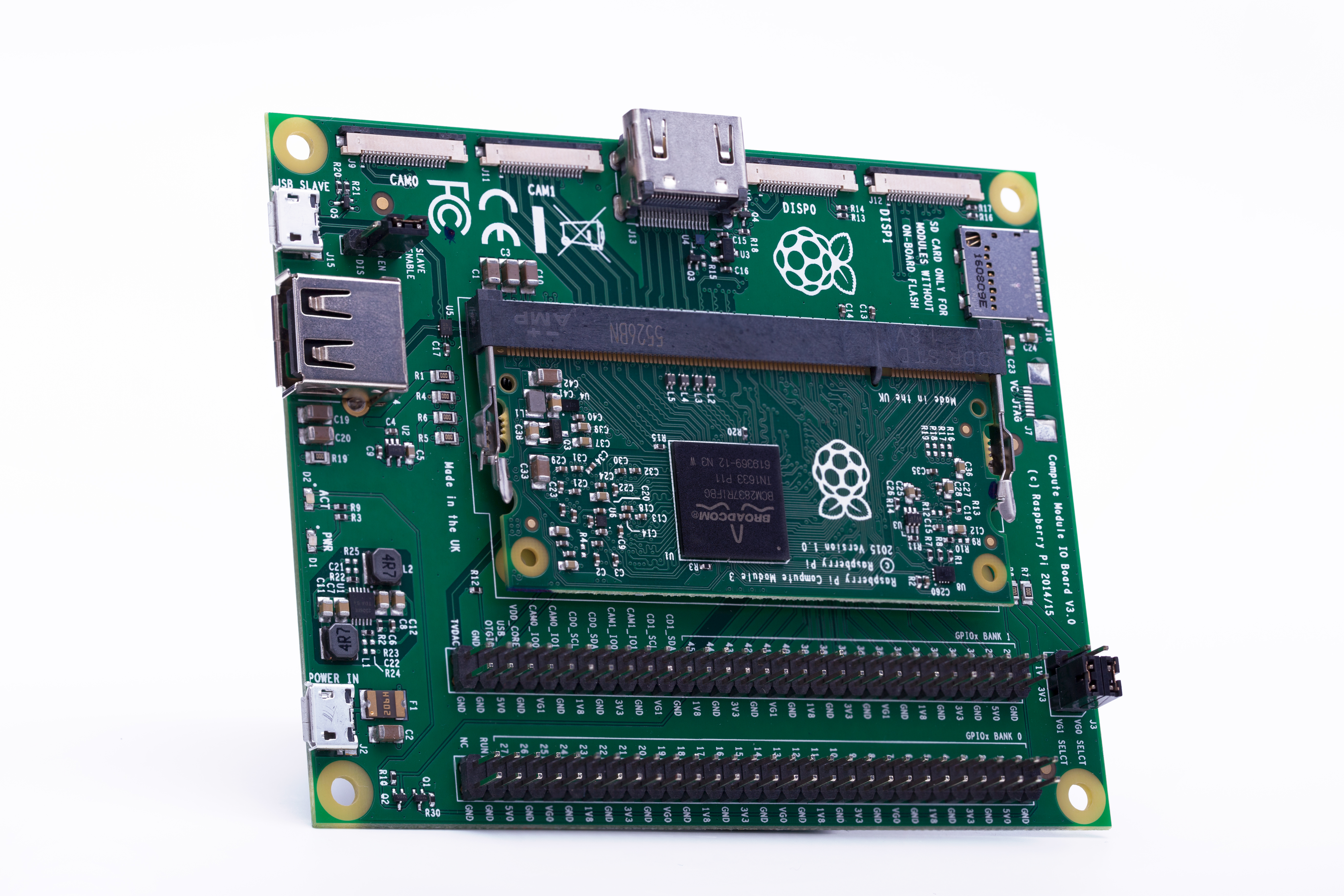
Raspberry Pi Compute Module 3 (center) mounted onto a carrier board intended for development

Using a carrier board is a benefit in many cases, as it can implement special I/O interfaces, memory devices, connectors or form factors. Separating the design of the carrier board and COM makes design concepts more modular, if needed. A carrier tailored to a special application may involve high design overhead by itself. If the actual processor and main I/O controllers are located on a COM, it is much easier, for example, to upgrade a CPU component to the next generation, without having to redesign a very specialized carrier as well. This can save costs and shorten development times. However, this only works if the board-to-board connection between the COM and its carrier remains compatible between upgrades.

Other benefits of using COM products instead of ground-up development include reducing time to market (TTM), risk reduction, cost savings, choice of a variety of CPUs, reduced requirements and time for customer design, and the ability to conduct both hardware and software development simultaneously.

== See also ==
- COM Express
- CoreExpress
- Embedded System Module
- ESMexpress
- ETX (form factor)
- Qseven
- SMARC
- XTX
