= ATX =

Motherboard and power supply configuration

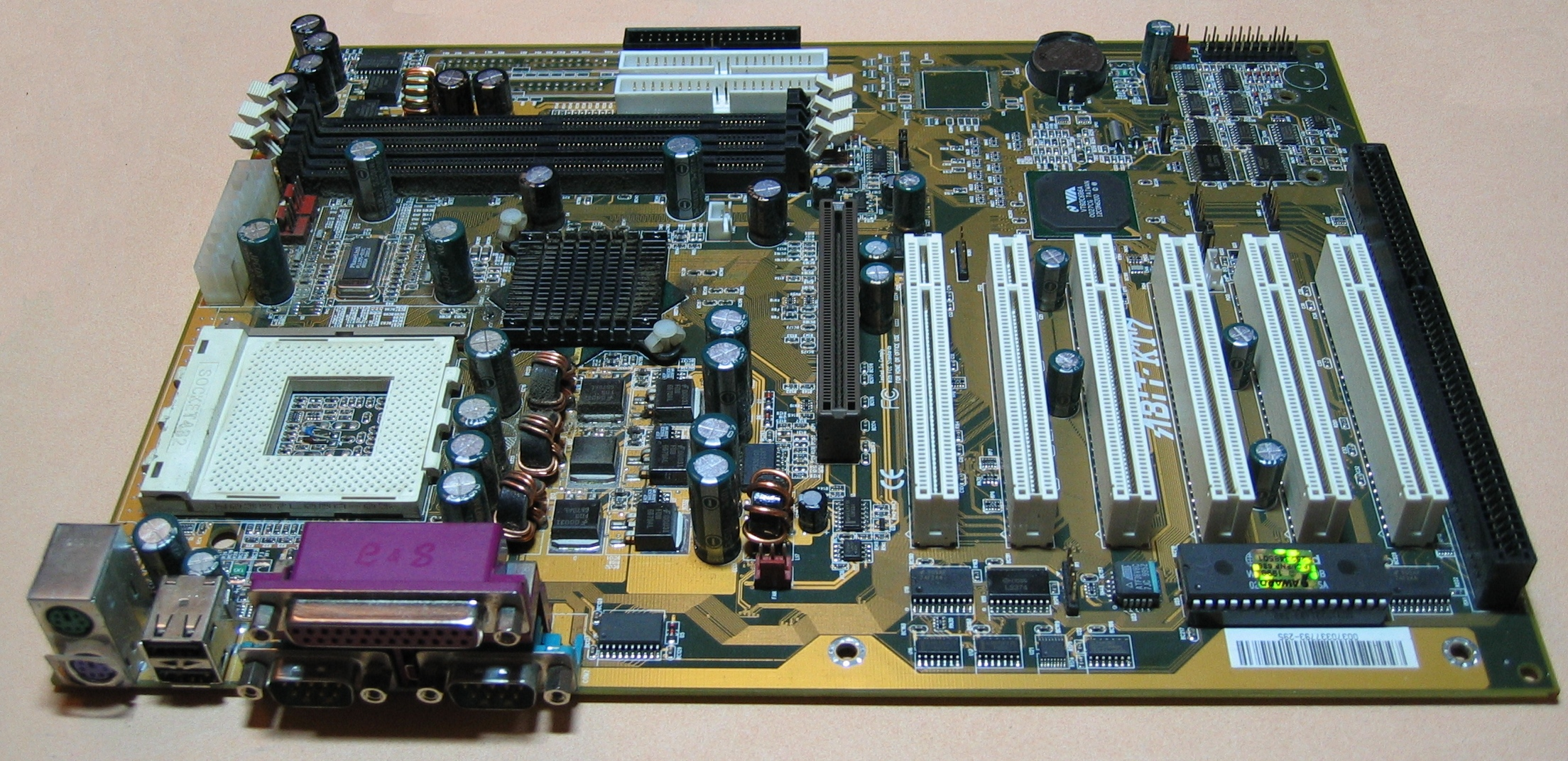
An ATX motherboard

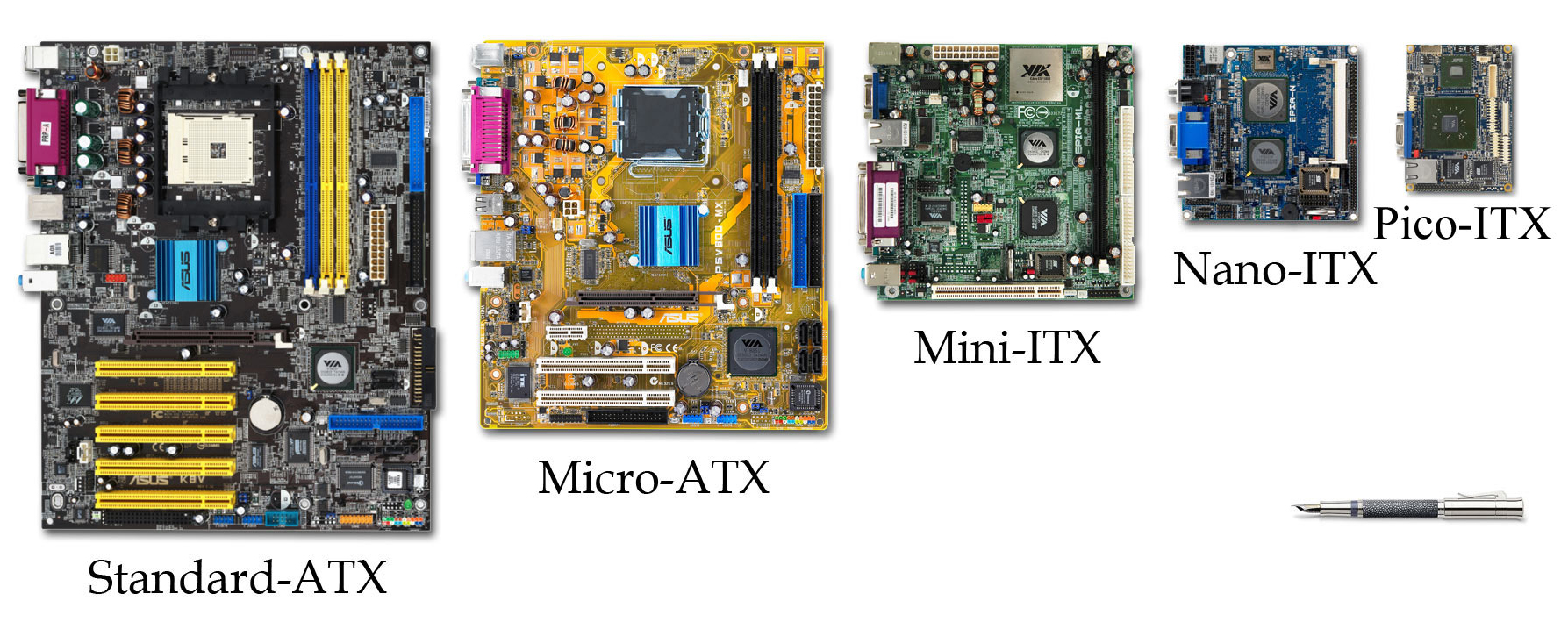
Comparison of some common motherboard form factors (pen for scale)

ATX (Advanced Technology Extended) is a motherboard and power supply form factor and configuration specification developed by Intel. It aimed to improve on previous de facto standards such as the AT design. Originally released in July 1995, it was the first major change in desktop computer enclosure, motherboard and power supply design in many years, improving standardization and interchangeability of parts. ATX as a motherboard standard defines the dimensions of the board, the mounting points to connect with the computer case, the input/output (I/O) connector panel, expansion slot placement, and power supply connectors. ATX as a power supply form factor defines the dimensions, electrical current, and cables of a desktop power supply, designed specifically to be compatible with ATX and similar motherboards.

ATX is a commonly used motherboard and power supply hardware form factor for desktop computers. The ATX form factor defined a general mounting point placement and I/O panel size that smaller motherboards share (such as microATX, FlexATX, and Mini-ITX), making them compatible in many computer cases.

== Overview ==
As of 2012, ATX is the most common motherboard design. Other standards for smaller boards (including microATX, FlexATX, nano-ITX, and mini-ITX) keep the basic rear layout but reduce the size of the board and the number of expansion slots. Dimensions of a full-size ATX board are 12 × 9.6 in (305 × 244 mm) which means microATX boards fit in many ATX chassis. The ATX specifications were patented by David Dent at Intel and co-developed with Astec America, a major manufacturer of power supplies at the time. The inaugural version 1.0 of the ATX specification was unveiled by Intel in July 1995. Since then, ATX has been revised numerous times. The most recent ATX motherboard specification is version 2.2. The most recent ATX12V power supply unit specification is ATX 3.0 released in February 2022.

EATX, or E-ATX (Extended ATX), is a term that refers to motherboards larger than the ATX standard. Motherboards labeled E-ATX commonly share dimensions with the SSI-EEB (Server System Infrastructure - Enterprise Electronics Bay) standard (12 × 13 in), however, it is not a guarantee. While some dual-CPU-socket motherboards have been implemented in ATX, the extra size of EATX makes it the typical form factor for dual-socket systems and for single-socket systems with a large number of memory slots (or more than two memory channels).

== BTX ==
In 2004, Intel announced the BTX (Balanced Technology eXtended) standard, intended as a replacement for ATX. While some manufacturers adopted the new standard, Intel discontinued any future development of BTX in 2006. As of 2026, the ATX design still remains the standard for personal computers.

== Connectors ==
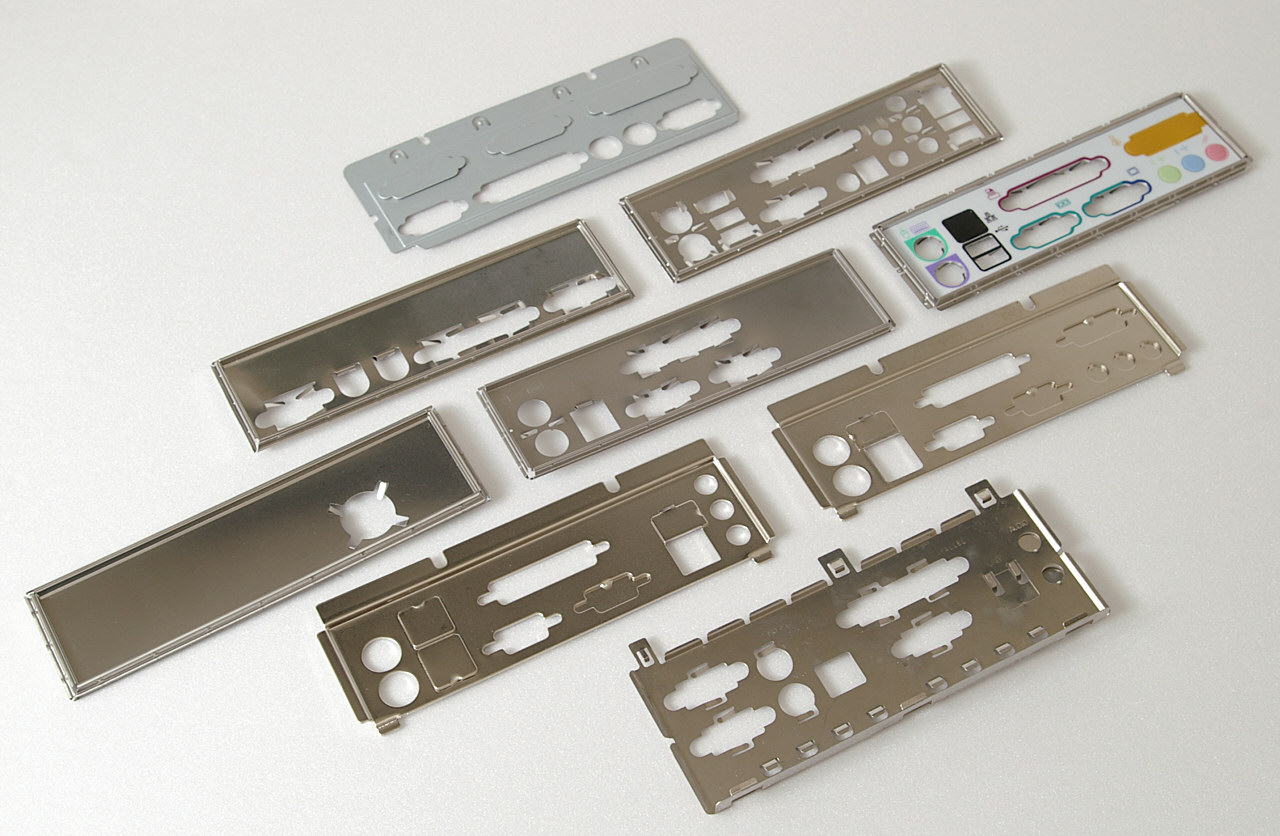
ATX I/O plates for motherboard rear connectors

On the back of the computer case, some major changes were made to the AT standard. Originally AT style cases had only a keyboard connector and expansion slots for add-on card backplates. Any other onboard interfaces (such as serial and parallel ports) had to be connected via flying leads to connectors which were mounted either on spaces provided by the case or brackets placed in unused expansion slot positions.

The ATX standard specified a rectangular area on the back of the system where motherboard manufacturers can arrange ports any way they want. A number of general patterns (depending on which ports the motherboard offers) have been used by most manufacturers. Cases are usually fitted with a snap-out panel, also known as an I/O plate or I/O shield, in one of the common arrangements. I/O plates are usually included with retail motherboards for installation in any suitable case. The computer will operate correctly without a plate fitted, but there will be open gaps in the case which may compromise the EMI/RFI screening and allow the ingress of dirt and random foreign bodies. Panels were made that fit an AT motherboard in an ATX case. Some ATX motherboards come with an integrated I/O plate.

ATX also made the PS/2-style mini-DIN keyboard and mouse connectors ubiquitous. AT systems used a 5-pin DIN connector for the keyboard and were generally used with serial port mice (although PS/2 mouse ports were also found on some systems). Many modern motherboards are phasing out the PS/2-style keyboard and mouse connectors in favor of the more modern Universal Serial Bus. Other legacy connectors that are slowly being phased out of modern ATX motherboards include 25-pin parallel ports and 9-pin RS-232 serial ports. In their place are onboard peripheral ports such as Ethernet, FireWire, eSATA, audio ports (both analog and S/PDIF), video (analog D-sub, DVI, HDMI, or DisplayPort), extra USB ports, and Wi-Fi.

== Variants ==
ATX, Mini-ITX, and AT motherboard compatible dimensions and bore positions

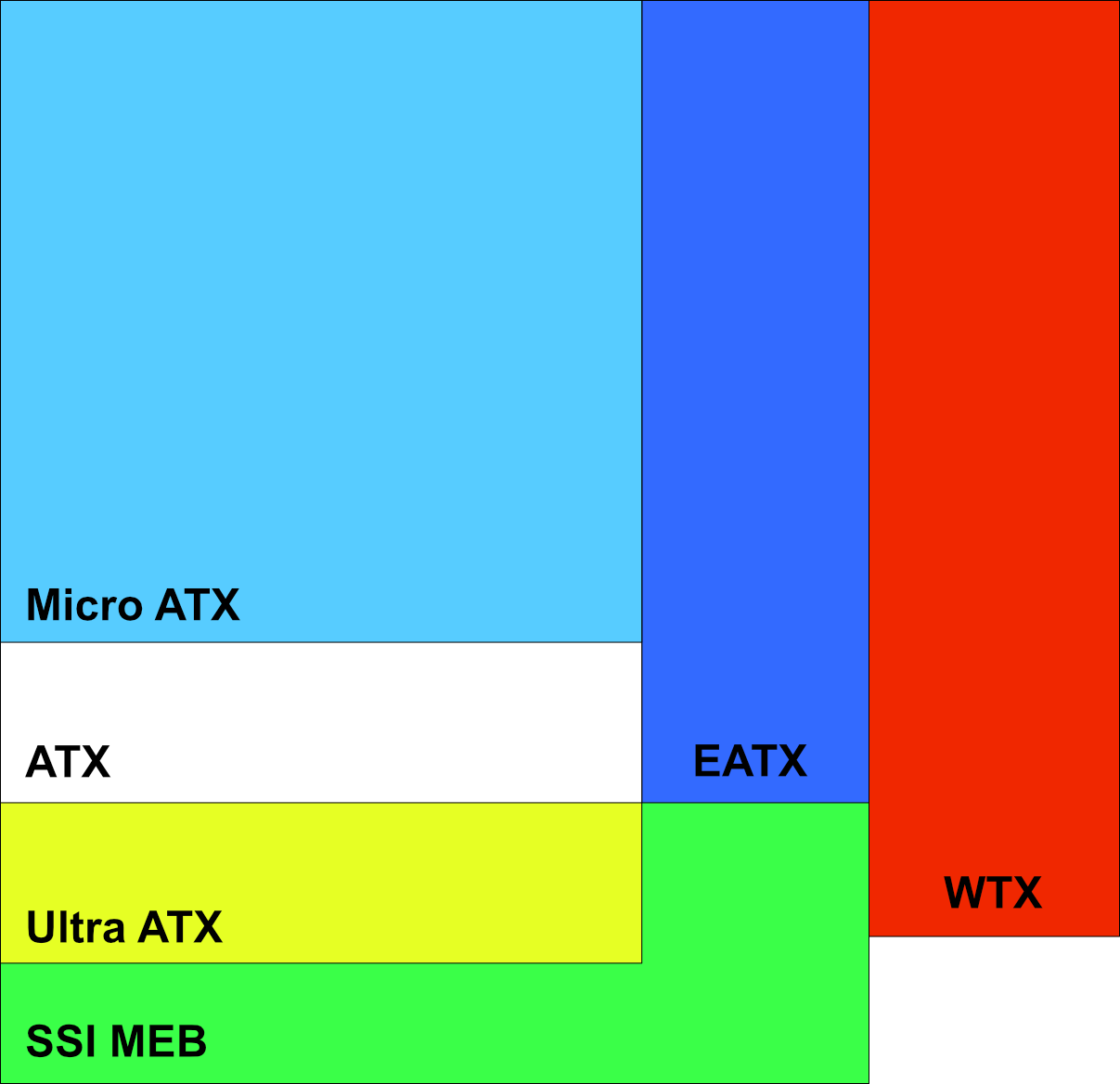
ATX motherboard size comparison; rear is on left. microATX (244 × 244 mm) Standard ATX (305 × 244 mm) Ultra ATX (366 × 244 mm) Extended ATX (EATX) (305 × 330 mm) WTX (356 × 425 mm) SSI MEB (411 × 330 mm)

Several ATX-derived designs have been specified that use the same power supply, mountings and basic back panel arrangement, but set different standards for the size of the board and number of expansion slots. Standard ATX provides seven slots at 0.8 in (20 mm) spacing; the popular microATX size removes 2.4 inches (61 mm) and three slots, leaving four. Here width refers to the distance along the external connector edge, while depth is from front to rear. Note each larger size inherits all previous (smaller) colors area.

AOpen has conflated the term Mini ATX with a more recent 15 × 15 cm (5.9 × 5.9 in) design. Since references to Mini ATX have been removed from ATX specifications since the adoption of microATX, the AOpen definition is the more contemporary term and the one listed above is apparently only of historical significance. This sounds contradictory to the now common Mini-ITX standard (17 × 17 cm (6.7 × 6.7 in)), which is a potential source of confusion. A number of manufacturers have added one to three additional expansion slots (at the standard 0.8 inch spacing) to the standard 12-inch ATX motherboard width.

Form factors considered obsolete in 1999 included Baby-AT, full size AT, and the semi-proprietary LPX for low-profile cases. Proprietary motherboard designs such as those by Compaq, Packard Bell, Hewlett Packard and others existed, and were not interchangeable with multi-manufacturer boards and cases. Portable and notebook computers and some 19-inch rackmount servers have custom motherboards unique to their particular products.

Form factor	Originated	Date	Max. size (Note: For boards which take expansion slots, the length of the expansion card aligns with the depth of the system board. The case may support cards longer than the depth of the mainboard.) depth × width	Slots	Notes (typical usage, market adoption, etc.)
ATX	Intel	1995	12 × 9.6 in (305 × 244 mm)	7 (Note: Most common ATX motherboards have 6 slots despite having the physical sizing for 7 slots.)	Original, successor to AT motherboard
SSI CEB	SSI	?	12 × 10.5 in (305 × 267 mm)	7	Compact Electronics Bay
SSI MEB	SSI	2011	16.2 × 13 in (411 × 330 mm)	12	Midrange Electronics Bay
SSI EEB	SSI	?	12 × 13 in (305 × 330 mm)	7	Enterprise Electronics Bay
SSI TEB	SSI	?	12 × 10.5 in (305 × 267 mm)	7	Thin Electronics Bay, for rack-mount, has board component height specification
microATX	Intel	1997	9.6 × 9.6 in (244 × 244 mm)	4	Fits in ATX, and EATX cases.
FlexATX	Intel	1997	9 × 7.5 in (229 × 191 mm)	3	
Extended ATX (standard)	Supermicro / Asus	?	12 × 13 in (305 × 330 mm)	7	Screw holes not completely compatible with some ATX cases. Intended for two CPU sockets.
Extended ATX (commonly)	Unknown	?	12 × 10.1 in (305 × 257 mm); 12 × 10.4 in (305 × 264 mm); 12 × 10.5 in (305 × 267 mm); 12 × 10.7 in (305 × 272 mm)	7	ATX pattern screw holes
EE-ATX	Supermicro	?	13.68 × 13 in (347 × 330 mm)	7	Enhanced Extended ATX
Ultra ATX	Foxconn	2008	14.4 × 9.6 in (366 × 244 mm)	10	Intended for multiple double-slot video cards, and dual CPUs.
XL-ATX	EVGA	2009	13.5 × 10.3 in (343 × 262 mm)	9	
XL-ATX	Gigabyte	2010	13.58 × 10.31 in (345 × 262 mm)	7	
XL-ATX	MSI	2010	13.6 × 10.4 in (345 × 264 mm)	7	
WTX	Intel	1998	14 × 16.75 in (356 × 425 mm).	9	Discontinued 2008
Mini-ITX	VIA	2001	6.7 × 6.7in (170 × 170 mm).	1	Originally designed for home theatre or other fanless applications
Mini-DTX	AMD	2007	8 × 6.7 in (203 × 170 mm)	2	Derived from Mini-ITX and DTX
BTX	Intel	2004	12.8 × 10.5 in (325 × 267 mm)	7	Canceled 2006. Also micro, nano, and pico variants. Not generally compatible with ATX mounting.
HPTX	EVGA	2010	13.6 × 15 in (345 × 381 mm)	6	Dual processors, 12 RAM slots
SWTX	Supermicro	2006	16.48 × 13 in (419 × 330 mm) and others	5	Quad processors, not compatible with ATX mounting
YTX	Asus, MSI & Maxsun	2023	6.89 × 9.65 in (175 × 245 mm)	1	New form factor supporting the DIY-APE initiative

Although true E-ATX is 12 × 13 in (305 × 330 mm) most motherboard manufacturers also refer to motherboards with measurements 12 × 10.1 in (305 × 257 mm), 12 × 10.4 in (305 × 264 mm), 12 × 10.5 in (305 × 267 mm) and 12 × 10.7 in (305 × 272 mm) as E-ATX. While E-ATX and SSI EEB (Server System Infrastructure (SSI) Forum's Enterprise Electronics Bay (EEB)) share the same dimensions, the screw holes of the two standards do not all align; rendering them incompatible.

In 2008, Foxconn unveiled a Foxconn F1 motherboard prototype, which has the same width as a standard ATX motherboard, but an extended 14.4" length to accommodate 10 slots. The firm called the new 14.4 × 9.6 in (366 × 244 mm) design of this motherboard "Ultra ATX" in its CES 2008 showing. Also unveiled during the January 2008 CES was the Lian Li Armorsuit PC-P80 case with 10 slots designed for the motherboard.

The name "XL-ATX" has been used by at least three companies in different ways:

- In September 2009, EVGA Corporation had already released a 13.5 × 10.3 in (343 × 262 mm) "XL-ATX" motherboard as its EVGA X58 Classified 4-Way SLI, which requires an Ultra-ATX sized case to support four "double-slot" graphics cards.
- Gigabyte Technology launched another XL-ATX motherboard, with model number GA-X58A-UD9 in 2010 measuring at 13.6 × 10.3 in (345 × 262 mm), and GA-X79-UD7 in 2011 measuring at 12.8 × 10.0 in (324 × 253 mm). In April 2010, Gigabyte announced its 12.8 × 9.6 in (325 × 244 mm) GA-890FXA-UD7 motherboard that allowed all seven slots to be moved downward by one slot position. The added length could have allowed placement of up to eight expansion slots, but the top slot position is vacant on this particular model.
- MSI released MSI X58 Big Bang in 2010, MSI P67 Big Bang Marshal in 2011, MSI X79 Xpower Big Bang 2 in 2012 and MSI Z87 Xpower in 2013 all of them are 13.6 × 10.4 in (345 × 264 mm). Although these boards have room for additional expansion slots (9 and 8 total, respectively), all three provide only seven expansion connectors; the topmost positions are left vacant to provide more room for the CPU, chipset and associated cooling.

In 2010, EVGA Corporation released a new motherboard, the "Super Record 2", or SR-2, whose size surpasses that of the "EVGA X58 Classified 4-Way SLI". The new board is designed to accommodate two Dual QPI LGA1366 socket CPUs (e.g. Intel Xeon), similar to that of the Intel Skulltrail motherboard that could accommodate two Intel Core 2 Quad processors and has a total of seven PCI-E slots and 12 DDR3 RAM slots. The new design is dubbed "HPTX" and is 13.6 × 15 in (345 × 381 mm).

== Power supply ==
The ATX specification requires the power supply to produce three main outputs, +3.3 V, +5 V and +12 V. Low-power −12 V and +5 V_{SB} (standby) supplies are also required. The −12 V supply can be used used to provide the negative supply voltage for RS-232 ports, by one pin on conventional PCI slots primarily to provide a reference voltage for some models of sound cards, or as power for motherboard audio. The 5 V_{SB} supply is used to produce trickle power to provide the soft-power feature of ATX when a PC is turned off, as well as powering the real-time clock to conserve the charge of the CMOS battery. A −5 V output was originally required because it was supplied on the ISA bus. However, it was removed in later versions of the ATX standard once ISA expansion slots became obsolete.

Originally, the motherboard was powered by one 20-pin connector. An ATX power supply provides a number of peripheral power connectors and (in modern systems) two connectors for the motherboard: an 8-pin (or 4+4-pin) auxiliary connector providing additional power to the CPU and a main 24-pin power supply connector, an extension of the original 20-pin version. 20-pin Molex 39-29-9202 at the motherboard. 20-pin Molex 39-01-2200 at the cable. The connector pin pitch is 4.20 mm (about one sixth of an inch).

Pinouts of ATX 2.x motherboard power connectors, 24-pin (top) and four-pin "P4" (bottom), as viewed into mating side of the plugs

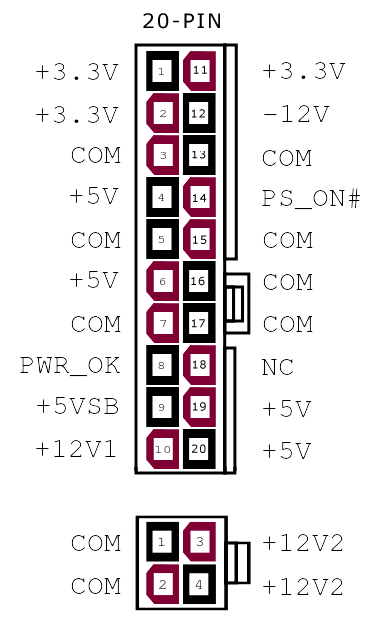
ATX 20-PIN

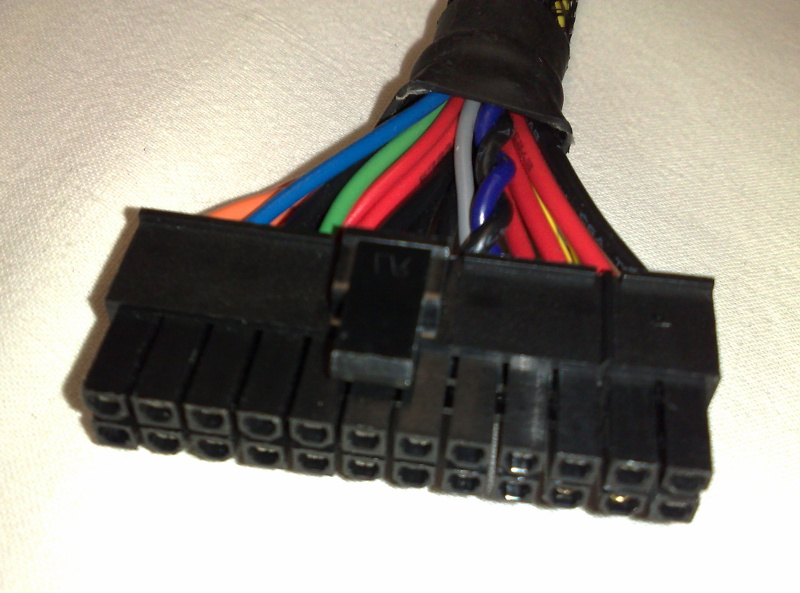
24-pin ATX motherboard power plug; pins 11, 12, 23 and 24 form a detachable separate four-pin plug, making it backward compatible with 20-pin ATX receptacles

24-pin ATX12V 2.x power supply connector
Color	Signal (Note: Light-blue background denotes control signals.)	Pin (Note: Light-green background denotes the pins present only in the 24-pin connector.)	Pin (Note: In the 20-pin connector, pins 13–22 are numbered 11–20 respectively.)	Signal	Color
Orange	+3.3 V	1	13	+3.3 V	Orange
Orange	+3.3 V	1	13	+3.3 V sense (Note: Supplies +3.3 V power and also has a second low-current wire for remote sensing.)	Brown
Orange	+3.3 V	2	14	−12 V (Note: Made optional in ATX 3.x.)	Blue
Black	Ground	3	15	Ground	Black
Red	+5 V	4	16	Power on (Note: A control signal that is pulled up to +5 V by the PSU and must be driven low to turn on the PSU.)	Green
Black	Ground	5	17	Ground	Black
Red	+5 V	6	18	Ground	Black
Black	Ground	7	19	Ground	Black
Grey	Power good (Note: A control signal that is low when other outputs have not yet reached, or are about to leave, correct voltages.)	8	20	Reserved (Note: Formerly −5 V ( white wire), absent in modern power supplies; it was optional in ATX and ATX12V v1.2 and deleted since v1.3.)	None
Purple	+5 V standby	9	21	+5 V	Red
Yellow	+12 V	10	22	+5 V	Red
Yellow	+12 V	11	23	+5 V	Red
Orange	+3.3 V	12	24	Ground	Black

ATX12VO power supply connector
Color	Signal	Pin	Pin	Signal	Color
Green	PS_ON#	1	6	PWR_OK	Gray
Black	COM	2	7	+12 VSB	Purple
Black	COM	3	8	+12 V1 DC	Yellow
Black	COM	4	9	+12 V1 DC	Yellow
TBD	Reserved	5	10	+12 V1 DC; Voltage Sensing Pin	Yellow

Molex connector part numbers
Pins	Receptacle on PS cable	Vertical header on PCB	Plug extender cable
4-pin	39-01-2040	39-28-1043	39-01-2046
20-pin	39-01-2200	39-28-1203	39-01-2206
24-pin	39-01-2240	39-28-1243	39-01-2246

Four wires have special functions:

- PS_ON# (power on) is a signal from the motherboard to the power supply. When the line is connected to ground (by the motherboard), the power supply turns on. It is internally pulled up to +5 V inside the power supply.
- PWR_OK ("power good") is an output from the power supply that indicates that its output has stabilized and is ready for use. It remains low for a brief time (100–500 ms) after the PS_ON# signal is pulled low.
- +5 V_{SB} (+5 V standby) supplies power even when the rest of the supply wire lines are off. This can be used to power the circuitry that controls the power-on signal.
- +3.3 V sense should be connected to the +3.3 V on the motherboard or its power connector. This connection allows remote sensing of the voltage drop in the power-supply wiring. Some manufacturers also provided a +5 V sense wire (typically colored pink) connected to one of the red +5 V wires on some models of power supply; however, the inclusion of such wire was a non-standard practice and was never part of any official ATX standard.

Generally, supply voltages must be within ±5% of their nominal values at all times. The little-used negative supply voltages, however, have a ±10% tolerance. There is a specification for ripple in a 10 Hz–20 MHz bandwidth:

Supply (V)	Tolerance	Range, min. to max. (V)	Ripple, p. to p., max. (mV)
+5	±5% (±0.25 V)	+4.75 V to +5.25	50
−5	±10% (±0.50 V)	−4.50 V to −5.50	50
+12	±5% (±0.60 V)	+11.40 V to +12.60	120
−12	±10% (±1.20 V)	−10.80 V to −13.20	120
+3.3	±5% (±0.165 V)	+3.135 V to +3.465	50
+5 standby	±5% (±0.25 V)	+4.75 V to +5.25	50

The 20–24-pin Molex Mini-Fit Jr. has a power rating of, 9 amperes maximum per pin). As large server motherboards and 3D graphics cards have required progressively more and more power to operate, it has been necessary to revise and extend the standard beyond the original 20-pin connector, to allow more current using multiple additional pins in parallel. The low circuit voltage is the restriction on power flow through each connector pin; at the maximum rated voltage, a single Mini-Fit Jr pin would be capable of 4800 watts.

=== Physical characteristics ===
ATX power supplies generally have the dimensions of 150 × 86 × 140 mm (5.9 × 3.4 × 5.5 in), with the width and height being the same as the preceding LPX (Low Profile eXtension) form factor (which are often incorrectly referred to as "AT" power supplies due to their ubiquitous use in later AT and Baby AT systems, even though the actual AT and Baby AT power supply form factors were physically larger) and share a common mounting layout of four screws arranged on the back side of the unit. That last dimension, the 140 mm depth, is frequently varied, with depths of 160, 180, 200 and 230 mm used to accommodate higher power, larger fan and/or modular connectors.

=== Main changes from AT and LPX designs ===
==== Power switch ====
Original AT cases (flat case style) have an integrated power switch that protruded from the power supply and sits flush with a hole in the AT chassis. It utilizes a paddle-style DPST switch and is similar to the PC and PC-XT style power supplies.

Later AT (so-called "Baby AT") and LPX style computer cases have a power button that is directly connected to the system computer power supply (PSU). The general configuration is a double-pole latching mains voltage switch with the four pins connected to wires from a four-core cable. The wires are either soldered to the power button (making it difficult to replace the power supply if it failed) or blade receptacles were used.

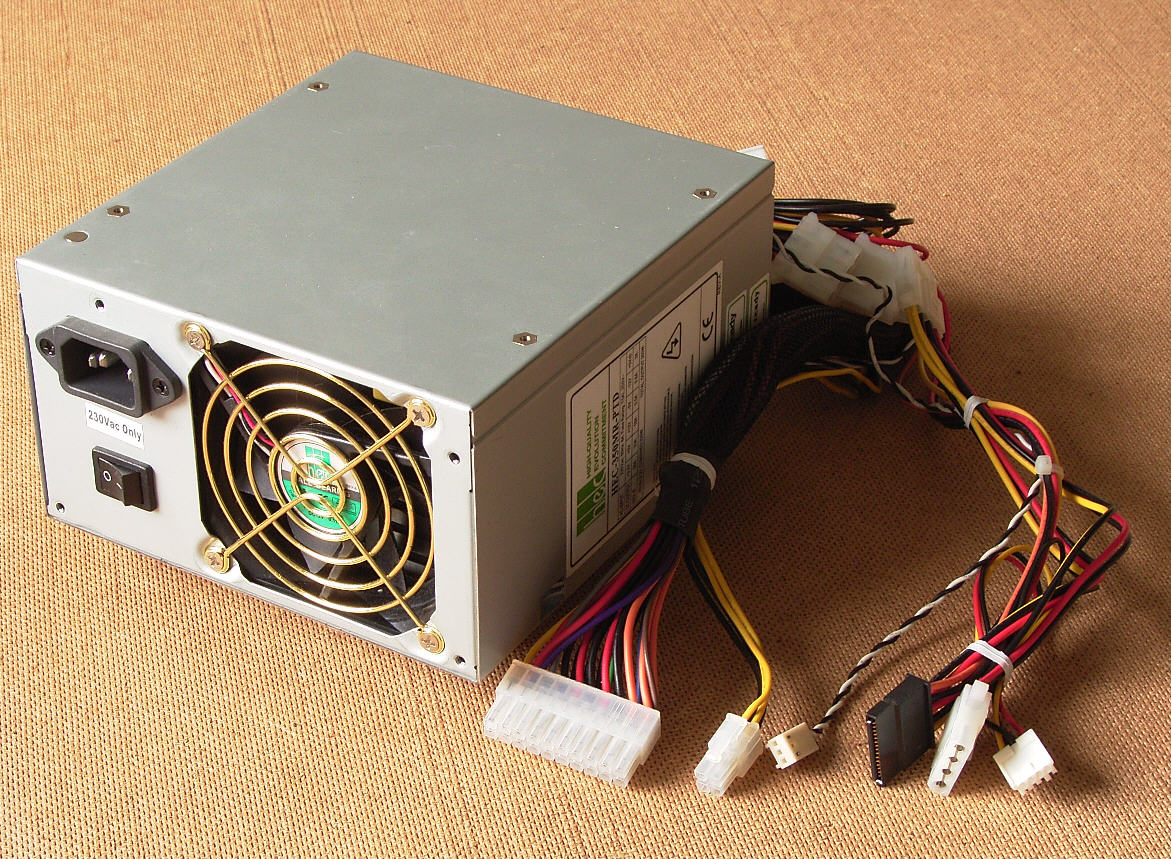
Typical ATX 1.3 power supply. From left to right, the connectors are 20-pin motherboard, 4-pin "P4 connector", fan RPM monitor (note the lack of a power wire), SATA power connector (black), "Molex connector" and floppy connector.

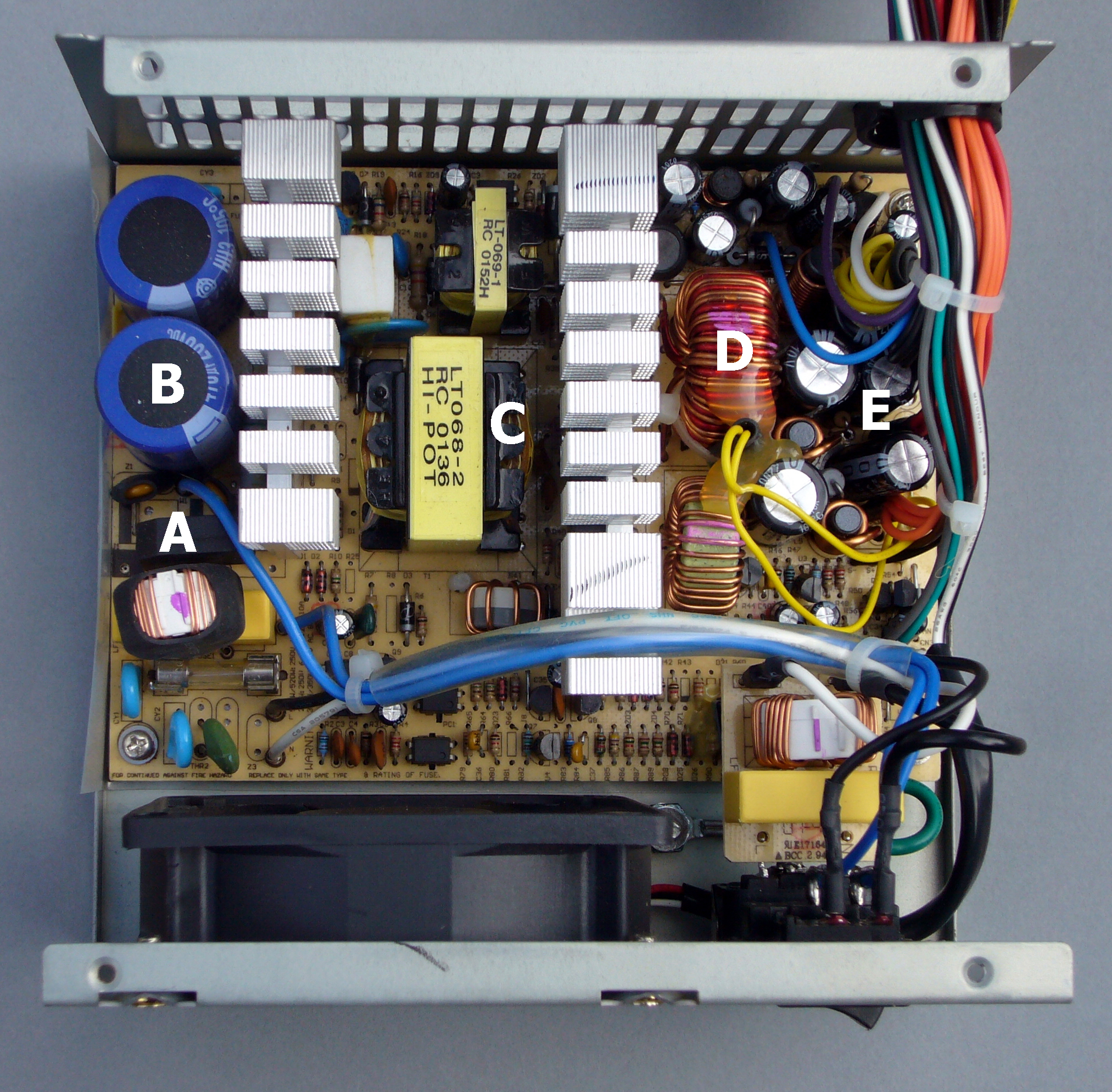
Interior view in an ATX power supply

An ATX power supply is typically controlled by an electronic switch connected to the power button on the computer case and allows the computer to be turned off by the operating system. In addition, many ATX power supplies have a manual switch on the back that also ensures no power is being sent to the components. When the switch on the power supply is turned off, the computer cannot be turned on with the front power button.

==== Power connection to the motherboard ====
The power supply's connection to the motherboard was changed from the older AT and LPX standards; AT and LPX had two similar connectors that could be accidentally interchanged by forcing the different keyed connectors into place, usually causing short-circuits and irreversible damage to the motherboard (the rule of thumb for safe operation was to connect the side-by-side connectors with the black wires together). ATX uses one large, keyed connector which can not be connected incorrectly. The new connector also provides a 3.3 volt source, removing the need for motherboards to derive this voltage from the 5 V rail. Some motherboards, particularly those manufactured after the introduction of ATX but whilst LPX equipment was still in use, support both LPX and ATX PSUs.

If using an ATX PSU for purposes other than powering an ATX motherboard, power can be fully turned on (it is always partly on to operate "wake-up" devices) by shorting the "power-on" pin on the ATX connector (pin 16, green wire) to a black wire (ground), which is what the power button on an ATX system does. A minimum load on one or more voltages may be required (varies by model and vendor); the standard does not specify operation without a minimum load and a conforming PSU may shut down, output incorrect voltages, or otherwise malfunction, but will not be hazardous or damaged. An ATX power supply is not a replacement for a current-limited bench laboratory DC power supply; instead it is better described as a bulk DC power supply.

==== Airflow ====
The original ATX specification called for a power supply to be located near to the CPU with the power supply fan drawing in cooling air from outside the chassis and directing it onto the processor. It was thought that in this configuration, cooling of the processor would be achievable without the need of an active heatsink. This recommendation was removed from later specifications; modern ATX power supplies usually exhaust air from the case.

=== ATX power supply revisions ===
==== Original ATX ====
ATX, introduced in late 1995, defined three types of power connectors:

- 4-pin "Molex connector" – transferred directly from AT standard: +5 V and +12 V for P-ATA hard disks, CD-ROMs, 5.25 inch floppy drives and other peripherals.
- 4-pin Berg floppy connector – transferred directly from AT standard: +5 V and +12 V for 3.5 inch floppy drives and other peripherals.
- 20-pin Molex Mini-fit Jr. ATX motherboard connector – new to the ATX standard.
- A supplemental 6-pin AUX connector providing additional 3.3 V and 5 V supplies to the motherboard, if needed. This was used to power the CPU in motherboards with CPU voltage regulator modules which required 3.3 volt and/or 5 volt rails and could not get enough power through the regular 20-pin header.

The power distribution specification defined that most of the PSU's power should be provided on 5 V and 3.3 V rails, because most of the electronic components (CPU, RAM, chipset, PCI, AGP and ISA cards) used 5 V or 3.3 V for power supply. The 12 V rail was only used by computer fans and motors of peripheral devices (HDD, FDD, CD-ROM, etc.)

==== ATX12V 1.x ====
While designing the Pentium 4 platform in 1999/2000, the standard 20-pin ATX power connector was found insufficient to meet increasing power-line requirements; the standard was significantly revised into ATX12V 1.0 (ATX12V 1.x is sometimes inaccurately called ATX-P4). ATX12V 1.x was also adopted by AMD Athlon XP and Athlon 64 systems. However, some early model Athlon XP and MP boards (including some server boards) and later model lower-end motherboards do not have the 4-pin connector as described below.

Numbering of the ATX revisions may be a little confusing: ATX refers to the design, and goes up to version 2.2 in 2004 (with the 24 pins of ATX12V 2.0), while ATX12V describes only the PSU. For instance, ATX 2.03 is quite commonly seen on PSUs from 2000 and 2001 and often includes the P4 12V connector, even if the norm itself did not define it yet.

===== ATX12V 1.0 =====
The main changes and additions in ATX12V 1.0 (released in February 2000) were:

- Increased the power on the 12 V rail (power on 5 V and 3.3 V rails remained mostly the same).
- An extra 4-pin Mini Fit Jr. (Molex 39-01-2040), 12-volt connector to power the CPU.
- Minimum 68% efficiency at full load.

Formally called the +12 V Power Connector, this is commonly referred to as the P4 connector because this was first needed to support the Pentium 4 processor.

Before the Pentium 4, processors were generally powered from the 5 V rail. Later processors operate at much lower voltages, typically around 1 V and some draw over 100 A. It is infeasible to provide power at such low voltages and high currents from a standard system power supply, so the Pentium 4 established the practice of generating it with a DC-to-DC converter on the motherboard next to the processor, powered by the 4-pin 12 V connector.

===== ATX12V 1.1 =====
This is a minor revision from August 2000. The power on the 3.3 V rail was slightly increased and other smaller changes were made.

===== ATX12V 1.2 =====
A relatively minor revision from January 2002. The only significant change was that the −5 V rail was no longer required (it became optional). This voltage was required by the ISA bus, which is no longer present on almost all modern computers.

===== ATX12V 1.3 =====
Introduced in April 2003 (a month after 2.0). This standard introduced some changes, mostly minor. Some of them are:

- Slightly increased the power on 12 V rail.
- Increased minimal efficiency for full load from 68% to 70% and defined minimal required PSU efficiencies for light (50% minimal efficiency) and typical (60% minimal efficiency) loads.
- Defined acoustic levels.
- Introduction of Serial ATA power connector (but defined as optional).
- Guidance for the −5 V rail was removed (but it was not prohibited).

==== ATX12V 2.x ====
ATX12V 2.x brought a significant design change regarding power distribution. By analyzing the power demands of then-current PCs, it was determined that it would be much cheaper and more practical to power most PC components from 12 V rails, instead of from 3.3 V and 5 V rails.

In particular, PCI Express expansion cards take much of their power from the 12 V rail (up to 5.5 A), while the older AGP graphics cards took only up to 1 A on 12 V and up to 6 A on 3.3 V. The CPU is also driven by a 12 V rail, while it was done by a 5 V rail on older PCs (before the Pentium 4).

===== ATX12V 2.0 =====
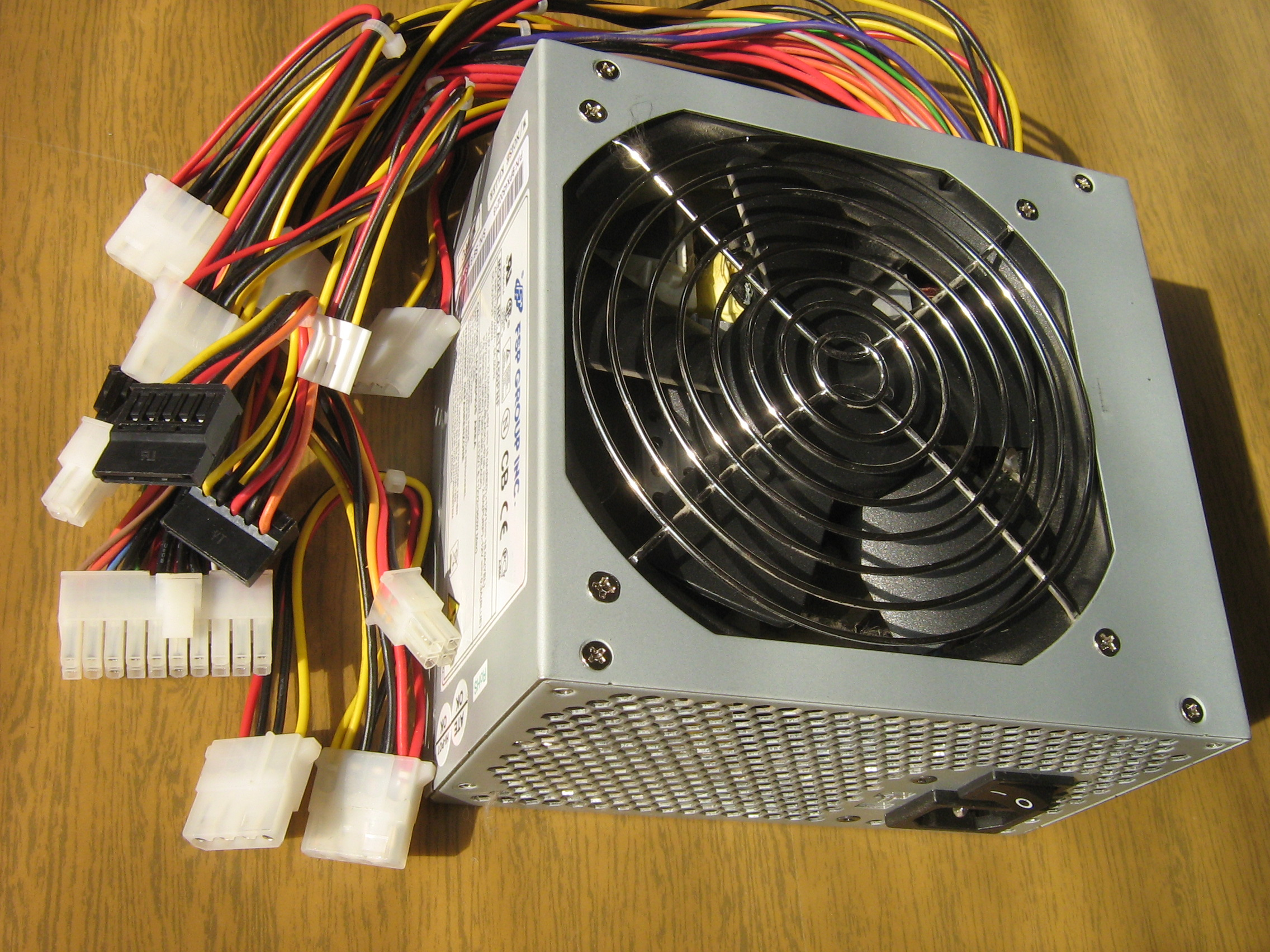
ATX-450PNF by FSP Group

The power demands of PCI Express were incorporated in ATX12V 2.0 (introduced in February 2003), which defined quite different power distribution from ATX12V 1.x:

- Most power is now provided on 12 V rails. The standard specifies that two independent 12 V rails (12 V_{2} for the four-pin connector and 12 V_{1} for everything else) with independent overcurrent protection are needed to meet the power requirements safely (some very high power PSUs have more than two rails; recommendations for such large PSUs are not given by the standard).
- The power on 3.3 V and 5 V rails was significantly reduced.
- The ATX motherboard connector was extended to 24 pins. The extra four pins provide one additional 3.3 V, 5 V and 12 V circuit.
- The six-pin AUX connector from ATX12V 1.x was removed because the extra 3.3 V and 5 V circuits which it provided are now incorporated in the 24-pin ATX motherboard connector.
- The power supply is required to include a Serial ATA power cable.
- Minimum efficiency of 60% for light load, 70% for typical load, and 70% for full load
- Many other specification changes and additions

===== ATX12V 2.01 =====
This is a minor revision from June 2004. An errant reference for the −5 V rail was removed. Other minor changes were introduced.

===== ATX12V 2.1 =====
This is a minor revision from March 2005. The power was slightly increased on all rails. Efficiency requirements changed: minimum 65% at light load, 72% at typical load, and 70% at full load. Introduced recommended minimum values of 75% at light load, 80% at typical load, and 77% at full load.

===== ATX12V 2.2 =====
Also released in March 2005 it includes corrections and specifies High Current Series wire terminals for 24-pin ATX motherboard and 4-pin +12 V power connectors.

===== ATX12V 2.3 =====
Effective March 2007. Recommended efficiency was increased to 80% (with at least 70% required) and the 12 V minimum load requirement was lowered. Higher efficiency generally results in less power consumption (and less waste heat) and the 80% recommendation brings supplies in line with new Energy Star 4.0 mandates. The reduced load requirement allows compatibility with processors that draw very little power during startup. The absolute over-current limit of 240 VA per rail was removed, allowing 12 V lines to provide more than 20 A per rail.

===== ATX12V 2.31 =====
This revision became effective in February 2008. It added a maximum allowed ripple/noise specification of 400 millivolts to the PWR_ON and PWR_OK signals, requires that the DC power must hold for more than 1 millisecond after the PWR_OK signal drops, clarified country-specific input line harmonic content and electromagnetic compatibility requirements, added a section about Climate Savers, updated recommended power supply configuration charts, and updated the cross-regulation graphs.

===== ATX12V 2.32 =====
This is the unofficial name given to the later revisions of the v2.31 specifications, published in May 2020

===== ATX12V 2.4 =====
The ATX12V 2.4 specifications were published in August 2012. It is specified in Revision 1.31 of the Power Supply Design Guide for Desktop Platform Form Factors, which names this as ATX12V version 2.4.

In July 2012, revision 1.3 of the Power Supply Design Guide for Desktop Platform Form Factors made inclusion of the floppy drive connector optional, instead of mandatory.

===== ATX12V 2.51 =====
The specifications for ATXV12 2.51 were released in September 2021 and introduced support for Alternative Low Power Mode (ALPM) which supersedes the traditional S3 power state. Windows 10 implements this functionality as Modern Standby.

===== ATX12V 2.52 =====
The specifications for ATXV12 2.52 were released in October 2021 introduces minor changes to the standard, most notably it requires power supply manufacturers to ensure power supplies with Alternative Low Power Mode (ALPM) support are able to withstand power cycles every 180 seconds (480 times per day or 175,200 per year). Power supply fans are also recommended to turn on with at least a two second delay for an improved user experience.

This version also stated that the floppy drive connector should be excluded from PSUs, as opposed to merely being optional, and marked that connector's section in the specification as "For Historical Reference Only".

===== ATX12V 2.53 =====
The specifications for ATX12V 2.53 were released in December 2021 and constitute another minor update to the ATX standard. ATX12V 2.53 makes further recommendations on efficiency and references the Energy Star Computers Specification Version 8.0 which was finalized in April 2020.

==== ATX 3.x ====
The specifications for ATX 3.0 were released in February 2022. It includes the new 16-pin 12VHPWR connector that can deliver up to 600 W for H+ and up to 675 W in H++ to graphics cards. These incorporate data lines for components to negotiate power capabilities with the PSU so they do not draw more power than the PSU is capable of delivering. The specification also has more strict requirements for handling spikes, two times the nominal output for 100 microseconds.

The −12 V supply is now specified as optional on the ATX motherboard connector, and some PSU manufacturers (e.g. Corsair) have begun removing the −12 V supply from their PSUs. However, as of 2025, some motherboards (e.g. recent designs from ASRock) still use the −12 V supply—typically to power the amplifier for on-board audio—and functions that use it will not work as expected.

ATX 3.1 replaces the 12VHPWR power connector with the 12V-2x6 power connector and reduces required power loss hold-up time from 17 milliseconds to 12 milliseconds.

=== ATX power supply derivatives ===
==== ATX12VO ====
Standing for ATX 12-volt-only, this is a new specification published by Intel in 2019, aimed at pre-built systems in the first run, and stricter power efficiency requirements by the California Energy Commission going into effect in 2021. Several OEMs were already using a similar design with proprietary connectors and this effectively standardizes those.

Under this standard, power supplies provide only a 12 V output. ATX12VO introduces a new 10-pin connector to supply the motherboard, replacing the 24-pin ATX12V connector. This greatly simplifies power supplies, but moves DC-to-DC conversion and some connectors to the motherboard instead. Notably, SATA power connectors, which include 3.3 V and 5 V pins, need to move to the motherboard instead of being connected directly to the power supply.

a. Connector pinout per Intel ATX12VO (12V Only) Desktop Power Supply Design Guide.

Pin	Signal	Colour	Pin	Signal	Colour
5	I_PSU%	Blue	10	12 V [12V Sensing Pin]	Yellow
4	GND	Black	9	12 V	Yellow
3	GND	Black	8	12 V	Yellow
2	GND	Black	7	12 V SB	Purple
1	PS_ON#	Green	6	PWR_OK	Gray

==== SFX ====
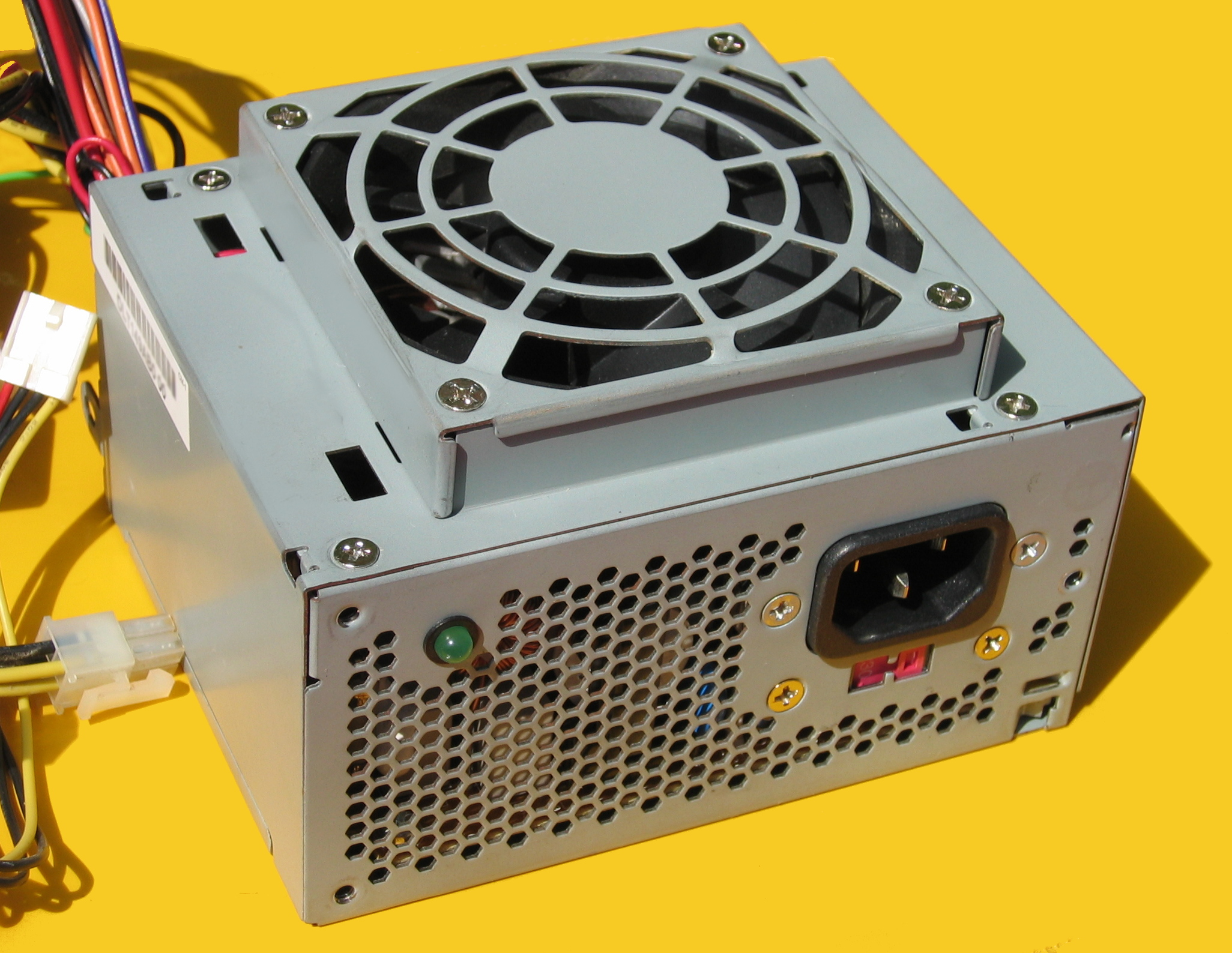
An SFX power supply unit

SFX (Small Form-Factor eXtended) is merely a design for a small form factor (SFF) power supply casing (such as those using microATX, FlexATX, nano-ITX, mini-ITX, and NLX), with the power specifications almost identical to ATX. Thus, an SFX power supply is mostly pin-compatible with the ATX power supply as the main difference is its reduced dimensions; the only electrical difference is that the SFX specifications do not require the −5 V rail. Since −5 V is required only by some ISA-bus expansion cards, this is not an issue with modern hardware and decreases productions costs. As a result, ATX pin 20, which carried −5 V, is absent in current power supplies; it was optional in ATX and ATX12V version 1.2 and deleted in version 1.3.

SFX has dimensions of 125 × 63.5 × 100 mm (width × height × depth), with a 60 mm fan, compared with the standard ATX dimensions of 150 × 86 × 140 mm. Optional 80 or 40 mm fan replacement increases or decreases the height of an SFX unit.

Some manufacturers and retailers incorrectly market SFX power supplies as μATX or MicroATX power supplies.

Some manufacturers make SFX-L dimensions of 125 × 63.5 × 130 mm to accommodate a 120 mm fan.

==== TFX ====
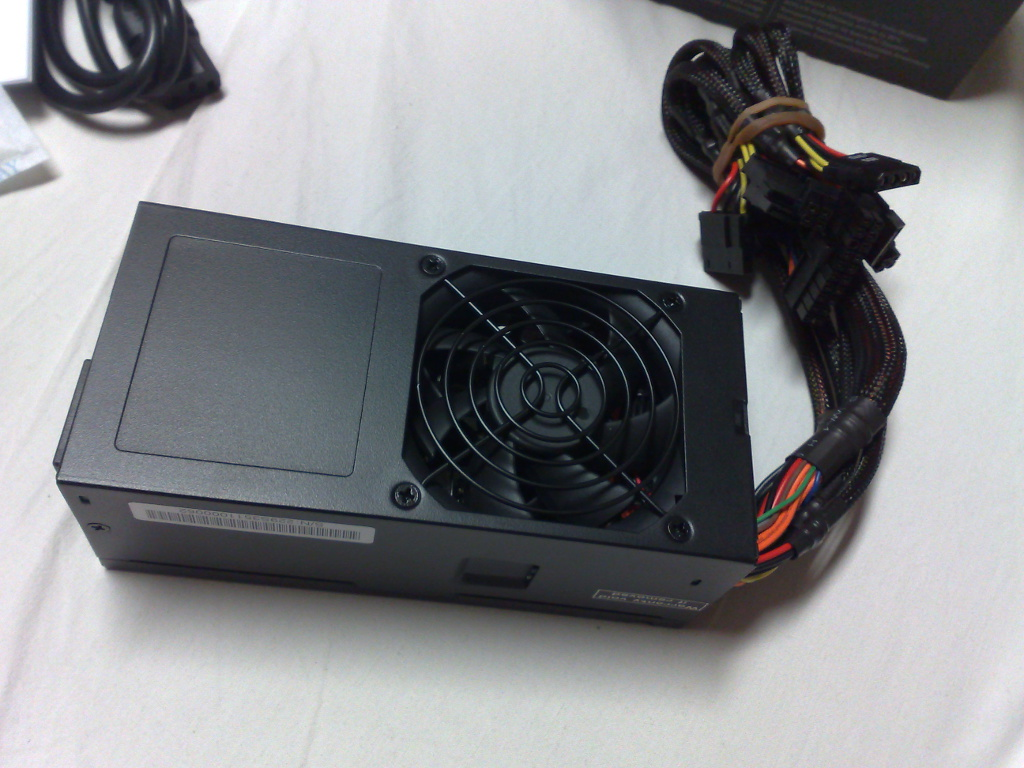
A TFX power supply unit

Thin Form Factor is another small power supply design with standard ATX specification connectors. Its dimensions are generally (W × H × D): 85 × 64 × 175 mm (3.34 × 2.52 × 6.89 in).

==== WTX ====
WTX power supplies provide a WTX style motherboard connector which is incompatible with the standard ATX motherboard connector.

==== AMD GES ====
This is an ATX12V power supply derivative made by AMD to power its Athlon MP (dual processor) platform. It was used only on high-end Athlon MP motherboards. It has a special 8-pin supplemental connector for motherboard, so an AMD GES PSU is required for such motherboards (those motherboards will not work with ATX(12 V) PSUs).

a. ATX12V-GES 24-pin P1 motherboard connector. The pinout on the motherboard connector is as follows when viewing the motherboard from above:

Pin	Signal	Colour	Pin	Signal	Colour
12	12 V	Yellow	24	12 V	Yellow
11	12 V	Yellow	23	GND	Black
10	GND	Black	22	GND	Black
9	GND	Black	21	3.3 V	Orange
8	3.3 V	Orange	20	3.3 V	Orange
7	3.3 V	Orange	19	3.3 V	Orange
6	GND	Black	18	GND	Black
5	PS_ON_N	Green	17	−12 V	Blue
4	GND	Black	16	5 V SB	Purple
3	GND	Black	15	GND	Black
2	5 V	Red	14	5 V	Red
1	5 V	Red	13	5 V	Red

b. ATX12V-GES 8-pin P2 motherboard connector. This pinout on the motherboard connector is as follows when viewing the motherboard from above:

Pin	Signal	Colour	Pin	Signal	Colour
4	GND	Black	8	12 V	Yellow striped black
3	GND	Black	7	12 V	Yellow striped black
2	PWR_OK	Gray	6	12 V	Yellow striped black
1	5 V	Red	5	GND	Black

==== EPS12V ====
EPS12V is defined in Server System Infrastructure (SSI) and used primarily by SMP/multi-core systems such as Core 2, Core i7, Opteron and Xeon. It has a 24-pin ATX motherboard connector (same as ATX12V v2.x), an 8-pin secondary connector and an optional 4-pin tertiary connector. Rather than include the extra cable, many power supply makers implement the 8-pin connector as two combinable 4-pin connectors to ensure backward compatibility with ATX12V motherboards.

=== Specification changes and additions ===
High-performance video card power demands dramatically increased during the 2000s and some high-end graphics cards have power demands that exceed AGP or PCIe slot capabilities. For these cards, supplementary power was delivered through a standard 4-pin peripheral or floppy power connector. Midrange and high-end PCIe graphics cards manufactured after 2004 typically use a standard 6- or 8-pin PCIe power connector directly from the PSU.

=== Efficiency ===
Efficiency in power supplies means the extent to which power is not wasted in converting electricity from a household supply to regulated DC. Computer power supplies vary from around 70% to over 90% efficiency.

Various initiatives exist to improve the efficiency of computer power supplies. Climate Savers Computing Initiative promotes energy saving and reduction of greenhouse gas emissions by encouraging development and use of more efficient power supplies. 80 PLUS certifies a variety of efficiency levels for power supplies and encourages their use via financial incentives. Efficient power supplies also save money by wasting less power; as a result they use less electricity to power the same computer, and they emit less waste heat which results in significant energy savings on central air conditioning in the summer. The gains of using an efficient power supply are more substantial in computers that use a lot of power.

Although a power supply with a larger than needed power rating will have an extra margin of safety against overloading, such a unit is often less efficient and wastes more electricity at lower loads than a more appropriately sized unit. For example, a 900-watt power supply with the 80 Plus Silver efficiency rating (which means that such a power supply is designed to be at least 85 percent efficient for loads above 180 W) may only be 73% efficient when the load is lower than 100 W, which is a typical idle power for a desktop computer. Thus, for a 100 W load, losses for this supply would be 27 W; if the same power supply was put under a 450 W load, for which the supply's efficiency peaks at 89%, the loss would be only 56 W despite supplying 4.5 times the useful power. For a comparison, a 500-watt power supply carrying the 80 Plus Bronze efficiency rating (which means that such a power supply is designed to be at least 82-percent efficient for loads above 100 W) may provide an 84 percent efficiency for a 100 W load, wasting only 19 W.

== See also ==
- Mini-ITX
- PC 97
- Power supply unit (computer)
- SSI CEB
