= 80 Plus =

Voluntary computer power supply certification program

Logo

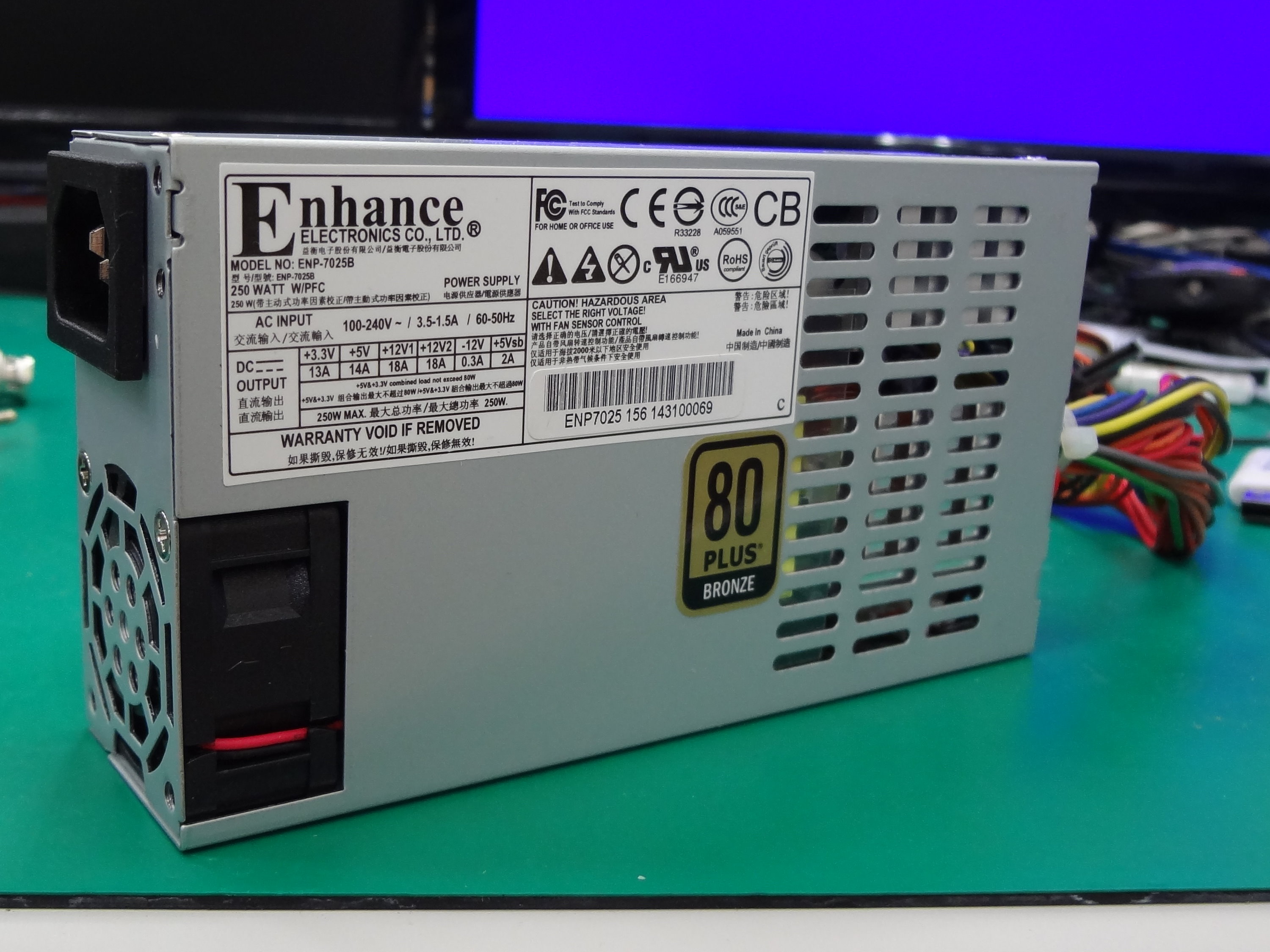
80 Plus Bronze certified FlexATX PSU

80 Plus (trademarked 80 PLUS) is a voluntary certification program launched in 2004, intended to promote efficient energy use in computer power supply units (PSUs).

Certification is acquirable for products that have more than 80% energy efficiency at 20%, 50% and 100% of rated load, and a power factor of 0.9 or greater at 100% load.

== History ==
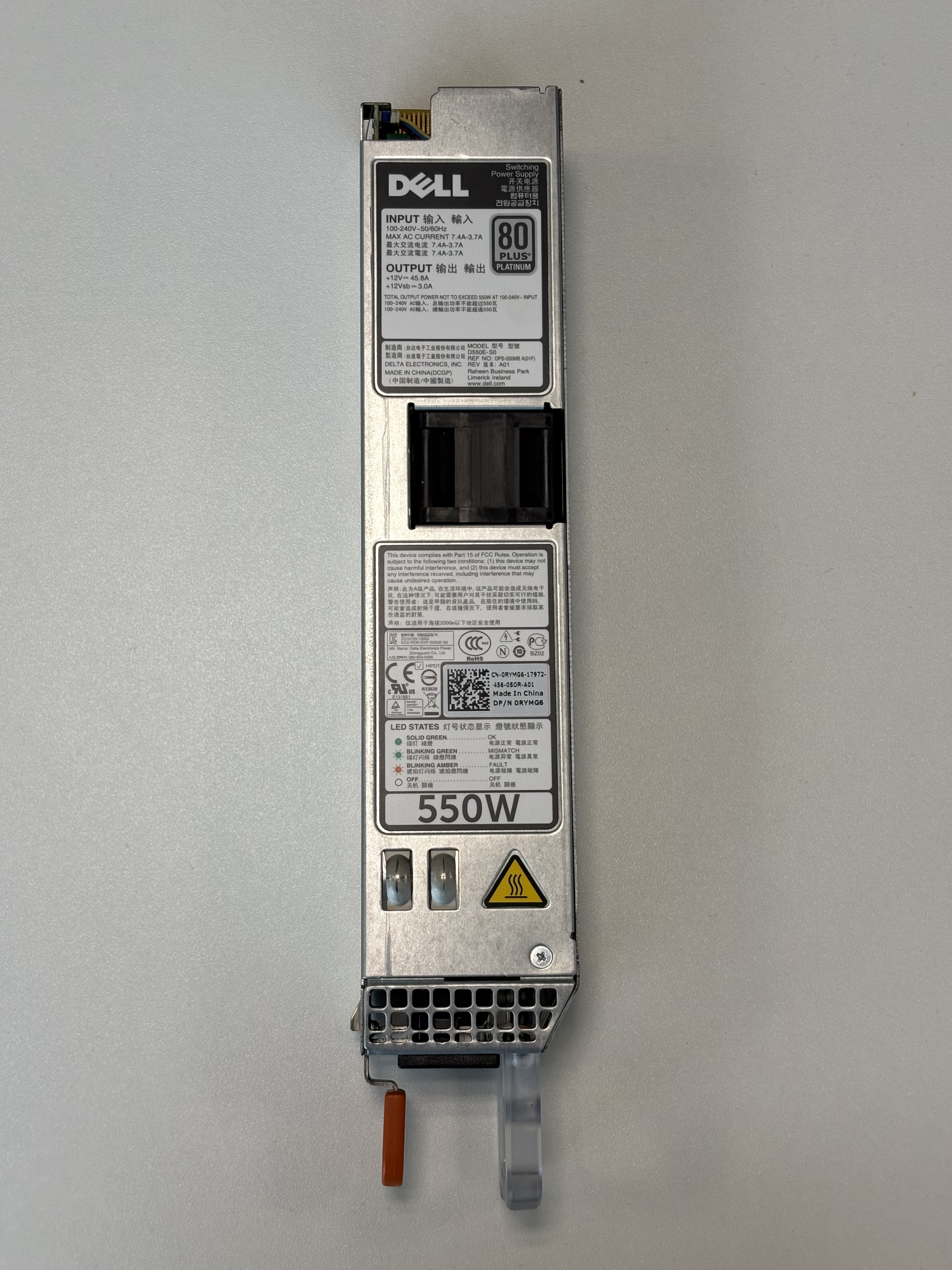
A 80 Plus Platinum certified redundant Server PSU

- EPRI (Electric Power Research Institute) and Ecos Consulting (promoter of the brand) develop the Generalized Internal Power Supply Efficiency Test Protocol for desktop derived multi-output power supplies.
- March 2004: the 80 Plus idea was presented as an initiative at the ACEEE Market Transformation Symposium.
- February 2005: the first market-ready power supply was created by Seasonic.
- 2006: Energy Star added 80 Plus requirements to their then-upcoming (in effect since July 2007) Energy Star 4.0 computer specifications.
- November and February 2006: HP and Dell certify their PSUs to the 80 Plus specification.
- 20 July 2007: Energy Star Computer Specification 4.0 goes into effect. The specification includes 80 Plus power supply efficiency levels for desktop computers.
- December 2007: over 200 PSUs on the market are 80 Plus certified and it is becoming the market standard.
- First-quarter 2008: standards revised to add Bronze, Silver, and Gold higher efficiency level certifications.
- October 2009: added specification for the Platinum efficiency level.
- February 2012: Dell and Delta Electronics working together were able to achieve world-first 80 Plus Titanium server power supply.
- April 2024, CLEAResult introduced the 80 PLUS Ruby certification, a new standard specifically designed for data center power supplies to address the power demands of AI and high-performance computing.The Ruby level requires a 96% efficiency at 50% load and 94% at 100%load.

=== Use by related initiatives ===
The Climate Savers Computing Initiative efficiency level targets for workstations for 2007 through 2011, corresponding to the 80 Plus certification levels. From July 2007 through June 2008, the basic 80 Plus level (Energy Star 4.0). For the next year, the target is 80 Plus Bronze level, the following year 80 Plus Silver, then 80 Plus Gold, and finally Platinum.

== Efficiency level certifications ==
As of August 2026, the following categories are available for classification:

- 115V Industrial: certified for industrial applications
- 115V and 230V EU Internal Non-Redundant: certified for desktop, workstation and non-redundant server applications
- 230V, 277V, 480V, 380V DC Internal and 800V DC Internal: certified for redundant data center applications

For the higher certification levels, the requirement of 0.9 or better power factor was extended to apply to 20% and 50% load levels, as well as at 100% load. The Platinum level requires 0.95 or better power factor for servers. Redundancy is typically used in data centers.

80 Plus Certification Levels
80 Plus grade	Icon
80 Plus	
80 Plus Bronze	
80 Plus Silver	
80 Plus Gold	
80 Plus Platinum	
80 Plus Titanium	
80 Plus Ruby	

80 Plus Certification Levels, 115V
80 PLUS Certification	115V Internal Non-Redundant					115V Industrial				
% of Rated Load	5%	10%	20%	50%	100%	5%	10%	25%	50%	100%
80 Plus	N.D.	N.D.	80%	80%	80% PFC ≥ 0.90	N.D.				
80 Plus Bronze	N.D.	N.D.	82%	85% PFC ≥ 0.90	82%	N.D.				
80 Plus Silver	N.D.	N.D.	85%	88% PFC ≥ 0.90	85%	N.D.	80%	85% PFC ≥ 0.90	88%	85%
80 Plus Gold	N.D.	N.D.	87%	90% PFC ≥ 0.90	87%	N.D.	82%	87% PFC ≥ 0.90	90%	87%
80 Plus Platinum	N.D.	N.D.	90%	92% PFC ≥ 0.95	89%	N.D.	85%	90% PFC ≥ 0.95	92%	90%
80 Plus Titanium	N.D.	90%	92% PFC ≥ 0.95	94%	90%	N.D.				
80 Plus Ruby	85%	91%	93% PFC ≥ 0.95	95%	91%	N.D.				

80 Plus Certification Levels, 230V
80 PLUS Certification	230V EU Internal Non-Redundant					230V Internal Redundant				
80 PLUS Certification	5%	10%	20%	50%	100%	5%	10%	20%	50%	100%
80 Plus	N.D.	N.D.	82%	85% PFC ≥ 0.90	82%	N.D.				
80 Plus Bronze	N.D.	N.D.	85%	88% PFC ≥ 0.90	85%	N.D.	80%	82%	85% PFC ≥ 0.90	82%
80 Plus Silver	N.D.	N.D.	87%	90% PFC ≥ 0.90	87%	N.D.	82%	85%	89% PFC ≥ 0.90	85%
80 Plus Gold	N.D.	N.D.	90%	92% PFC ≥ 0.90	89%	N.D.	85%	88%	92% PFC ≥ 0.90	88%
80 Plus Platinum	N.D.	N.D.	92%	94% PFC ≥ 0.95	90%	N.D.	88%	90%	94% PFC ≥ 0.95	91%
80 Plus Titanium	N.D.	90%	93% PFC ≥ 0.95	95%	91%	N.D.	90%	94% PFC ≥ 0.95	96%	91%
80 Plus Ruby	85%	91%	94% PFC ≥ 0.95	96%	92%	90% PFC ≥ 0.90	91% PFC ≥ 0.90	95% PFC ≥ 0.96	96.5% PFC ≥ 0.96	92% PFC ≥ 0.96

80 Plus Certification Levels, Industrial Voltages
80 PLUS Certification	277V Internal Redundant					480V Internal Redundant					380V DC / 800V DC Internal Redundant				
% of Rated Load	5%	10%	20%	50%	100%	5%	10%	20%	50%	100%	5%	10%	20%	50%	100%
80 Plus	N.D.														
80 Plus Bronze	N.D.	80%	82%	85% PFC ≥ 0.90	82%	N.D.									
80 Plus Silver	N.D.	82%	85%	89% PFC ≥ 0.90	85%	N.D.									
80 Plus Gold	N.D.	85%	88%	92% PFC ≥ 0.90	88%	N.D.									
80 Plus Platinum	N.D.	88%	90%	94% PFC ≥ 0.95	91%	N.D.	88%	90%	94% PFC ≥ 0.95	91%	N.D.	88%	90%	94%	91%
80 Plus Titanium	N.D.	90%	94% PFC ≥ 0.95	96%	91%	N.D.	90%	94% PFC ≥ 0.95	96%	91%	N.D.	90%	94%	96%	91%
80 Plus Ruby	90% PFC ≥ 0.90	91% PFC ≥ 0.90	95% PFC ≥ 0.96	96.5% PFC ≥ 0.96	92% PFC ≥ 0.96	90% PFC ≥ 0.90	91% PFC ≥ 0.90	95% PFC ≥ 0.96	96.5% PFC ≥ 0.96	92% PFC ≥ 0.96	90%	91%	95%	96.5%	92%

Data Source:

== Certification ==
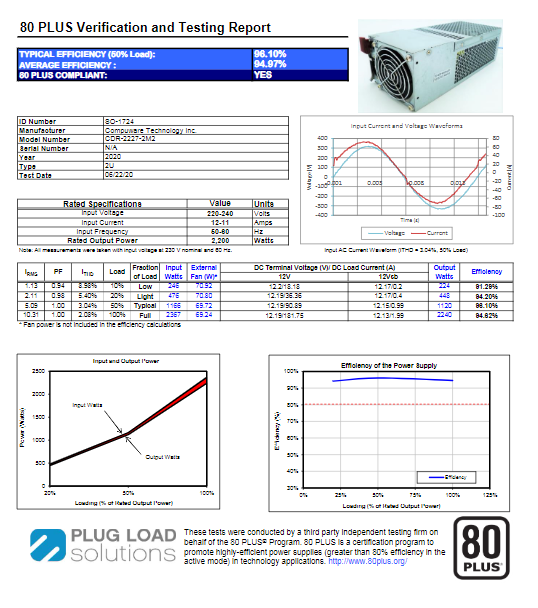
80+ Titanium Certification Example for Compuware model CDR-2227-2M2 PSU

External image
- AcBel Polytech PSQ002 Test Report, an example of the more thorough 80 Plus Ruby testing. Report includes standby power and fan power draw.

Plug Load Solutions tests PSUs according to their testing protocol and lists certified PSUs with downloadable certificates in PDF format, allowing consumers to verify how many and which models are listed by each company.

=== Misleading power supply advertising ===
There have been instances where companies claim or imply that their supplies are 80 Plus when they have not been certified, and in some cases do not meet the requirements. For example, the highest 80 Plus is 80+ Titanium (95.4% efficiency at 50% load). Some companies will claim they meet this requirement even when they are only close (i.e. 94.xx%) therefore claiming 80+ Titanium. However, this is not the case as one could easily modify the test unit to be more enhanced than production models in order to slightly raise numbers.

When a company resells an OEM power supply under a new name, it must be certified under the new name and company, even if the OEM supply is certified. In some instances, a reseller has claimed a higher wattage than the supply can deliver, so the resellers' supply would not meet 80 Plus requirements.

Although some power supply manufacturers name their products with similar names, such as "85 Plus", "90 Plus" and "95 Plus", there is no such official certification or standard.

== Technical overview ==
The efficiency of a computer power supply is its output power divided by its input power; the remaining input power is converted to heat as expected under conservation of energy. For instance, a 600 W power supply with 60% efficiency running at full load would draw 1000 W from the mains and waste 400 W as heat.

600 W output
400 W heat

1000 W input

A 600 W power supply with 80% efficiency running at full load would draw 750 W from the mains and waste only 150 W as heat.

600 W output
150 W heat

750 W input

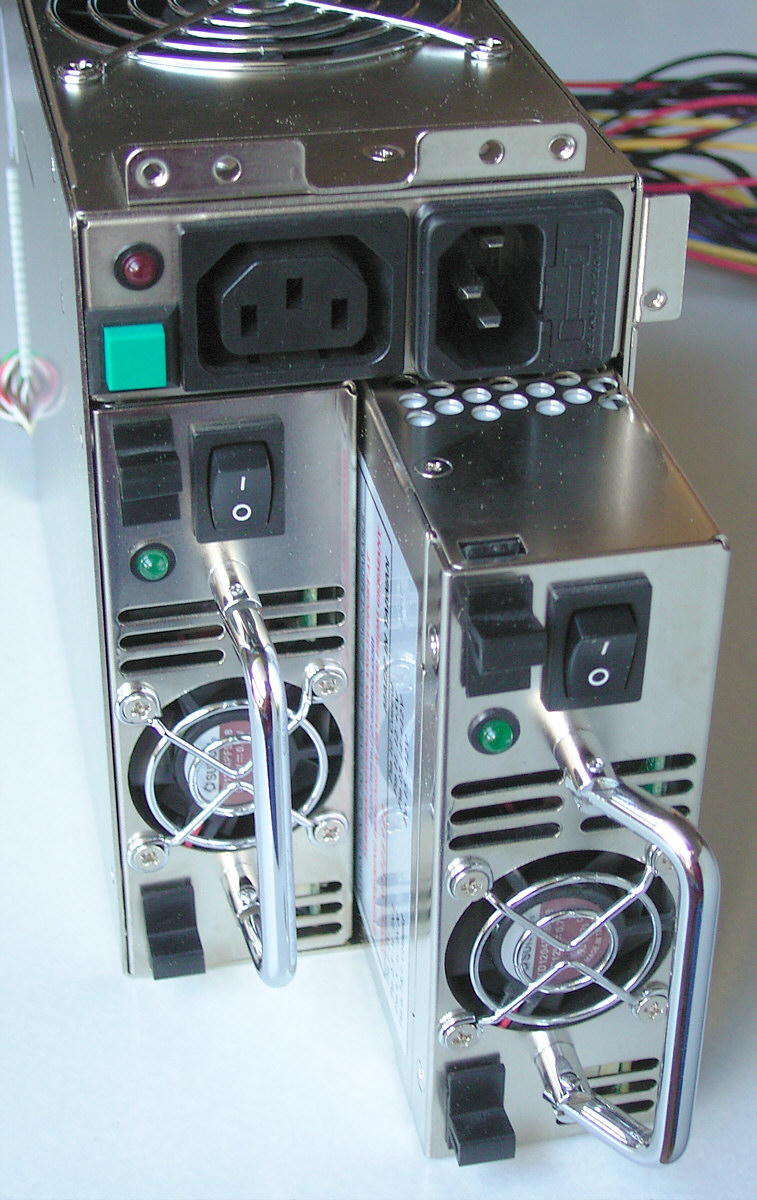
Redundant power supply contains two (or more) modules.

For a given power supply, efficiency varies depending on how much power is being delivered. Supplies are typically most efficient at between half and three-quarters load, much less efficient at low load, and somewhat less efficient at maximum load. Older ATX power supplies were typically 60% to 75% efficient. To qualify for 80 Plus, a power supply must achieve at least 80% efficiency at three specified loads (20%, 50% and 100% of maximum rated power). However, 80 Plus supplies may still be less than 80% efficient at lower loads. For instance, an 80 Plus, 520 watt supply could still be 70% or less efficient at 60 watts (a typical idle power for a desktop computer). Thus it is still important to select a supply with capacity appropriate to the device being powered.

It is easier to achieve the higher efficiency levels for higher wattage supplies, so gold and platinum supplies may be less available in consumer-level supplies of reasonable capacity for typical desktop machines.

Typical computer power supplies may have power factors as low as 0.5 to 0.6. The higher power factor reduces the peak current draw, reducing load on the circuit or on an uninterruptible power supply.

Reducing the heat output of the computer helps reduce noise, since fans do not have to spin as fast to cool the computer. Reduced heat and resulting in lower cooling demands may increase computer reliability.

== Shortcomings ==
=== Thermal conditions at full load ===
The testing conditions may give an unrealistic expectation of efficiency for heavily loaded, high power (rated much larger than 300 W) supplies. A heavily loaded power supply and the computer it is powering generate significant amounts of heat, which may raise the power supply temperature, which is likely to decrease its efficiency. Since power supplies are certified at room temperature, this effect is not taken into account.

Technically speaking, 80 Plus does test the power supply at full load, under which it is affected by its own heat generation. What it does not test is the effects of the heat generated by other components in the computer making its way into the power supply. There are additional requirements on testing PSUs with cooling fans, which draw power and reduce the measured efficiency. PSUs with no fan or an always-on, fixed-speed fan can be tested directly. PSUs with an internally-controlled fan must undergo a warmup period of 30 minutes or five fan cycles. PSUs with an externally-controlled fan should be tested at minimum fan speed setting.

=== Standby and very low load ===
80 Plus does not set efficiency targets for very low load. For instance, generation of standby power may still be relatively inefficient, and may not meet requirements of the One Watt Initiative. Testing of 80 Plus power supplies shows that they vary considerably in standby efficiency. Some power supplies consume half a watt or less in standby with no load, where others consume several times as much at standby, even though they may meet higher 80 Plus certification requirement levels.

The 80 Plus Titanium level expands requirements to include efficiency at 10% load. The 80 Plus Ruby level additionally includes efficiency at 5% load. See tables above for precise requirements.

The 80 Plus measurement protocol includes the measurement of standby power, but it is not stated anywhere on their webpage whether it is taken account into certification.

== See also ==
- AC adapter
- Green computing
- IT energy management
- Power management
- Performance per watt
- Quiet PC
