= WTX =

WTX can refer to:

- WTX (form factor)
- Another name for the gene FAM123B
- WTX101, a bis-choline tetrathiomolybdate de-coppering therapy
