= MicroATX =

Standard motherboard form factor

ATX motherboard size comparison; rear is on left. FlexATX (229 × 191 mm) microATX (244 × 244 mm) Mini ATX (284 × 208 mm) Standard ATX (305 × 244 mm) Extended ATX (EATX) (305 × 330 mm) WTX (356 × 425 mm)

In computer design, microATX (sometimes referred to as mATX or µATX) is a standard motherboard form factor introduced in December 1997. The maximum size of a microATX motherboard is 9.6 × 9.6 in (244 × 244 mm). However, there are examples of motherboards using microATX designation despite having a smaller size of 244 × 205 mm (9.6 × 8.1 in). The standard ATX size is 25% longer, at 12 × 9.6 in (305 × 244 mm).

== Backward compatibility ==
microATX was explicitly designed to be backward compatible with ATX. The mounting points of microATX motherboards are a subset of those used on full-size ATX boards, and the I/O panel is identical. Thus, microATX motherboards can be used in full-size ATX cases. Furthermore, most microATX motherboards generally use the same power connectors as ATX motherboards, (Note: As of 2007, most motherboards follow the ATX12V 2.2 specification, which provides for a 24-pin main power connector, and a 4-pin auxiliary connector.) thus permitting the use of full-size ATX power supplies with microATX boards.

microATX boards often use the same chipsets as full-size ATX boards, allowing them to use many of the same components. However, since microATX cases are typically much smaller than ATX cases, they usually have fewer expansion slots.

== Expandability ==
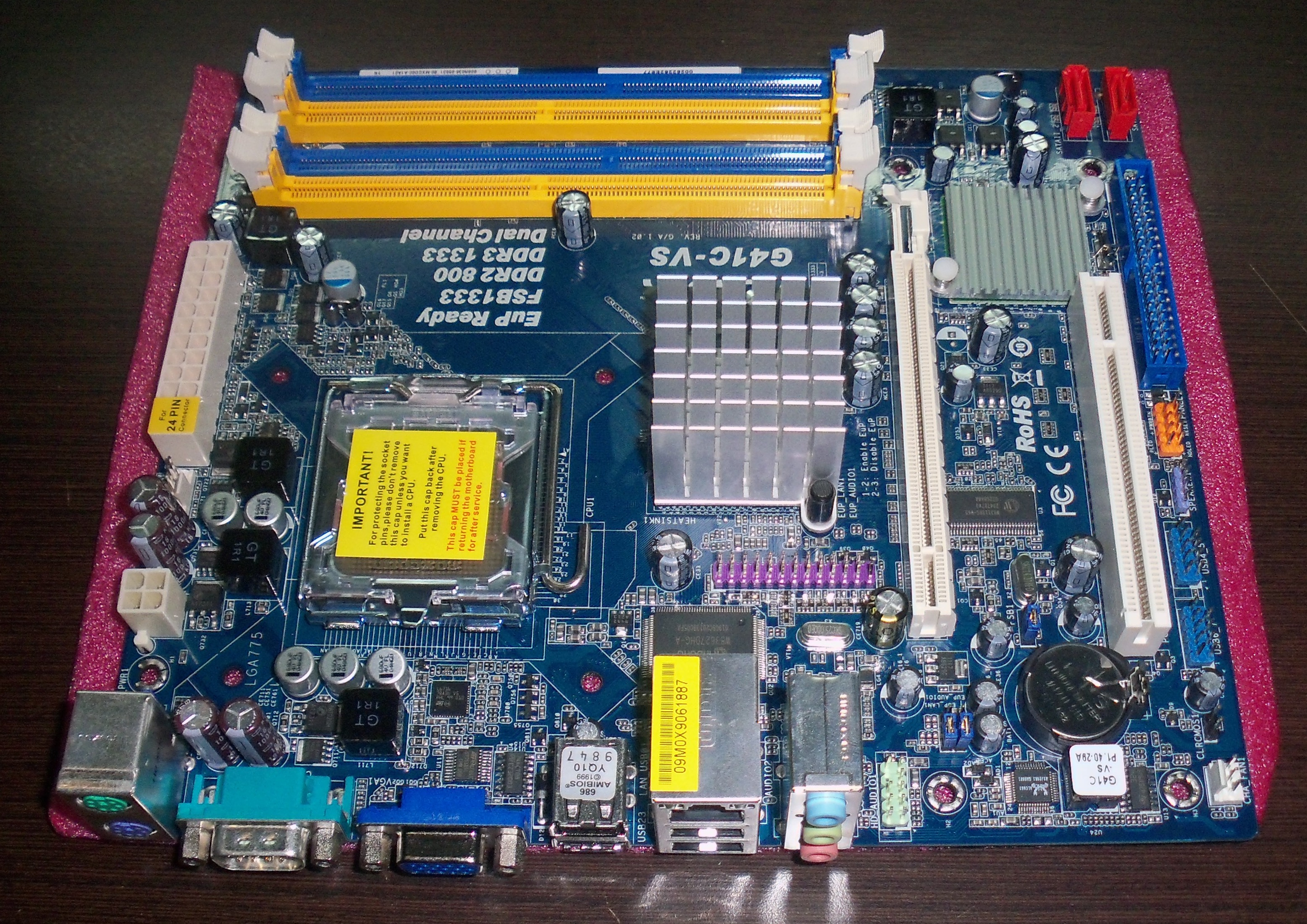
The G41C-VS, an ASRock microATX motherboard

Most modern ATX motherboards have a maximum of seven PCI or PCI-Express expansion slots, while microATX boards only have a maximum of four (four being the maximum permitted by the specification). In order to conserve expansion slots and case space, many manufacturers produce microATX motherboard with a full range of integrated peripherals (especially integrated graphics), which may serve as the basis for small form factor and media center PCs. For example, the ASRock G31M-S motherboard (pictured right) features onboard Intel GMA graphics, HD Audio audio, and Realtek Ethernet (among others), thus freeing up the expansion slots that would have been used for a graphics card, sound card, and Ethernet card. In recent years, however, it is common even for ATX boards to integrate all these components, as much of this functionality is contained in the typical northbridge–southbridge pair.

In the DIY PC market, microATX motherboards in general are favored by cost-conscious buyers, where cost savings for the equivalent feature sets outweigh the added expandability of extra PCI/PCI Express slots provided by the full ATX versions. Since 2006, dual-GPU configurations became possible on microATX motherboards for high-end enthusiast gaming setups, further reducing the need for full ATX motherboards.

In addition, some microATX cases require the use of low-profile PCI cards and use power supplies with non-standard dimensions.

Compared to Mini-ITX, microATX motherboards have a maximum of four expansion slots and four DIMM slots, as opposed to the single expansion slot and two DIMM (or SO-DIMM) slots on Mini-ITX motherboards. This means that microATX allows dual-graphics card and quad-channel memory configurations.
