= Molex connector =

Two-piece pin-and-socket connector

AMP four-pin Mate-n-Lok
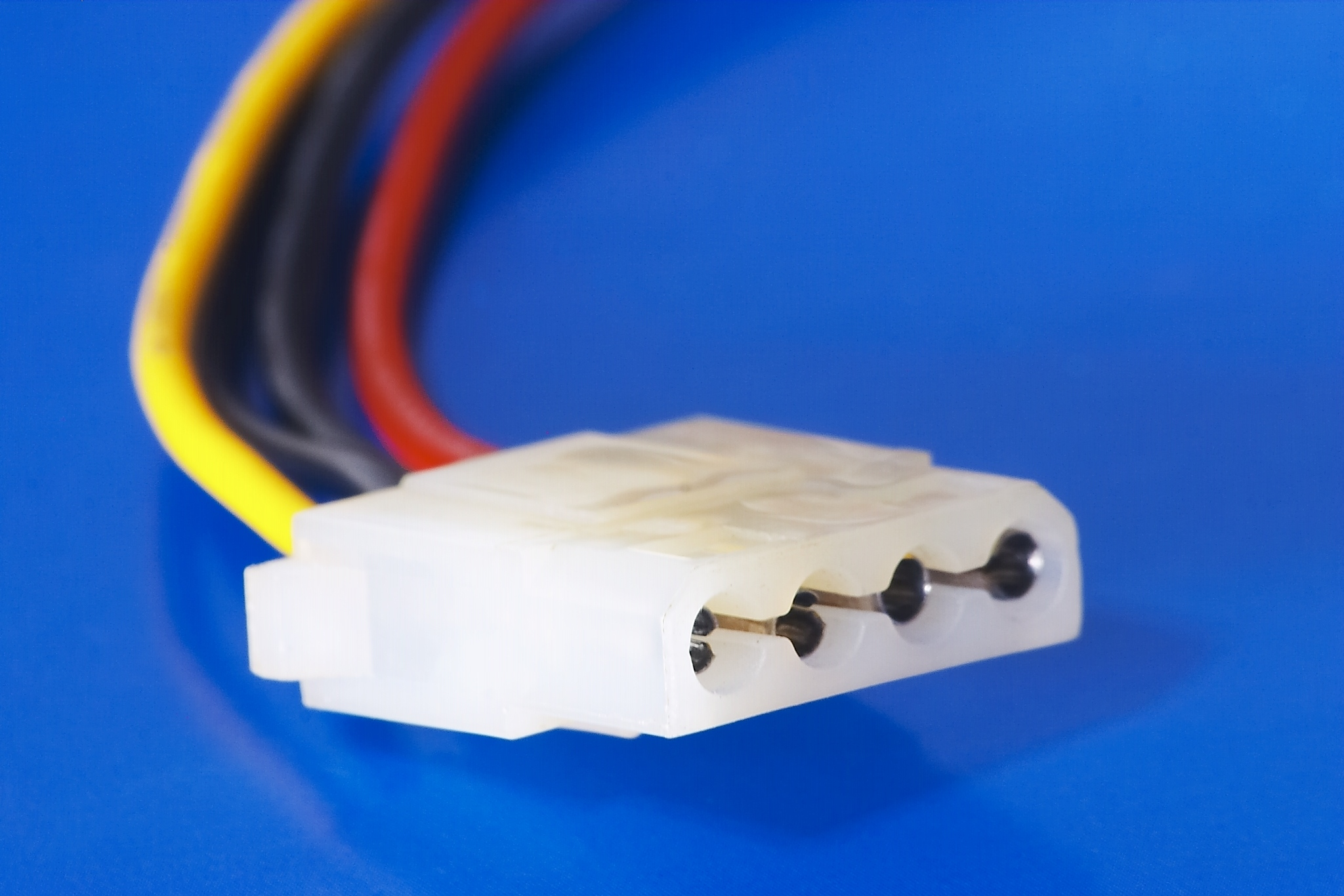
- AMP Mate-n-Lok 1-480424-0 Power connector (female pins, male connector)
- Type: Electrical power connector

Production history
- Manufacturer: AMP
- Produced: 1963

General specifications
- Width: 21 mm (female), 23 mm (male)
- Height: 6 mm (female), 8 mm (male)
- Pins: 4

Electrical
- Signal: Yes
- Max. voltage: 12 V
- Max. current: 11 A/pin (18AWG w/30 °C rise)

Pinout
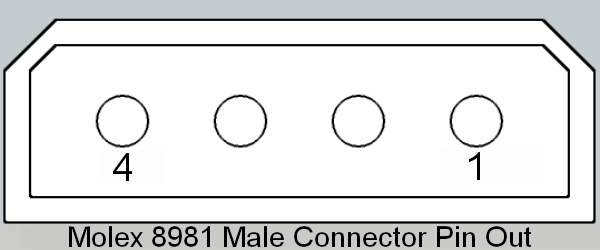
- Male pins (female connector)
Pin	Color	Type
Pin 1	Yellow	+12 V
Pin 2	Black	Ground
Pin 3	Black	Ground
Pin 4	Red	+5 V
- 18 AWG, or 0.823 mm^{2} wire is typically used.

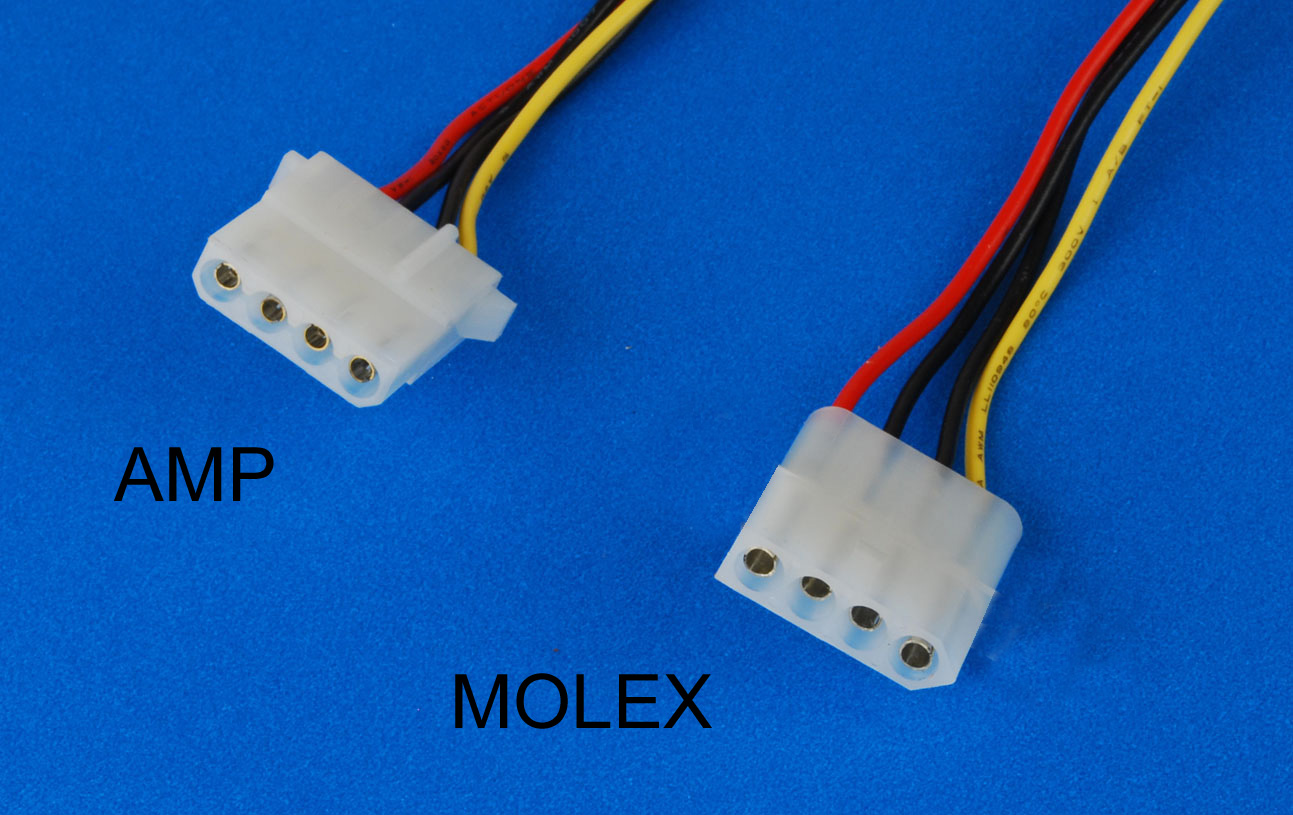
AMP Mate-n-Lok and Molex 8981 0.093-inch pin and socket power connectors

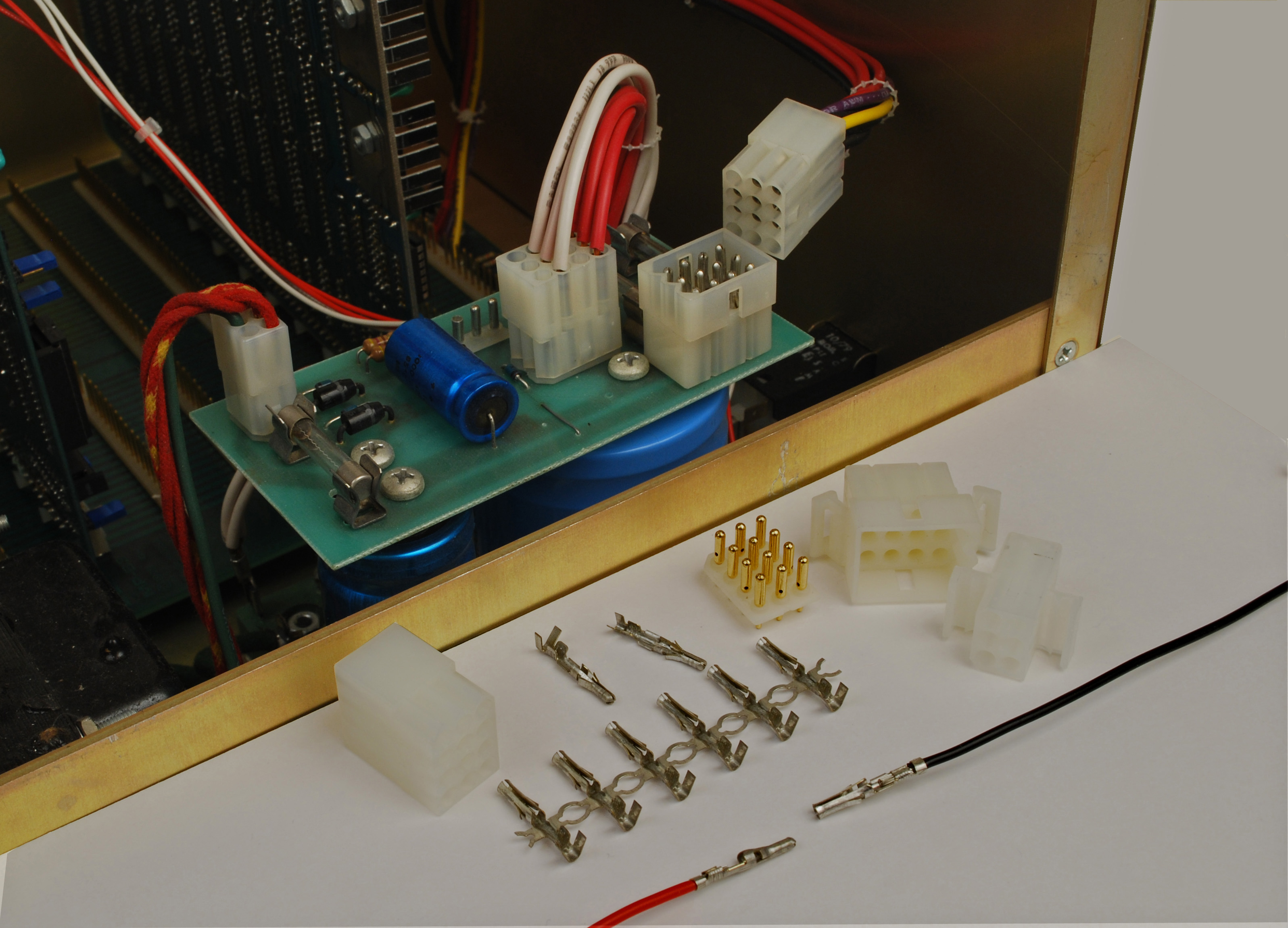
Molex standard 0.093-inch pin and socket connectors

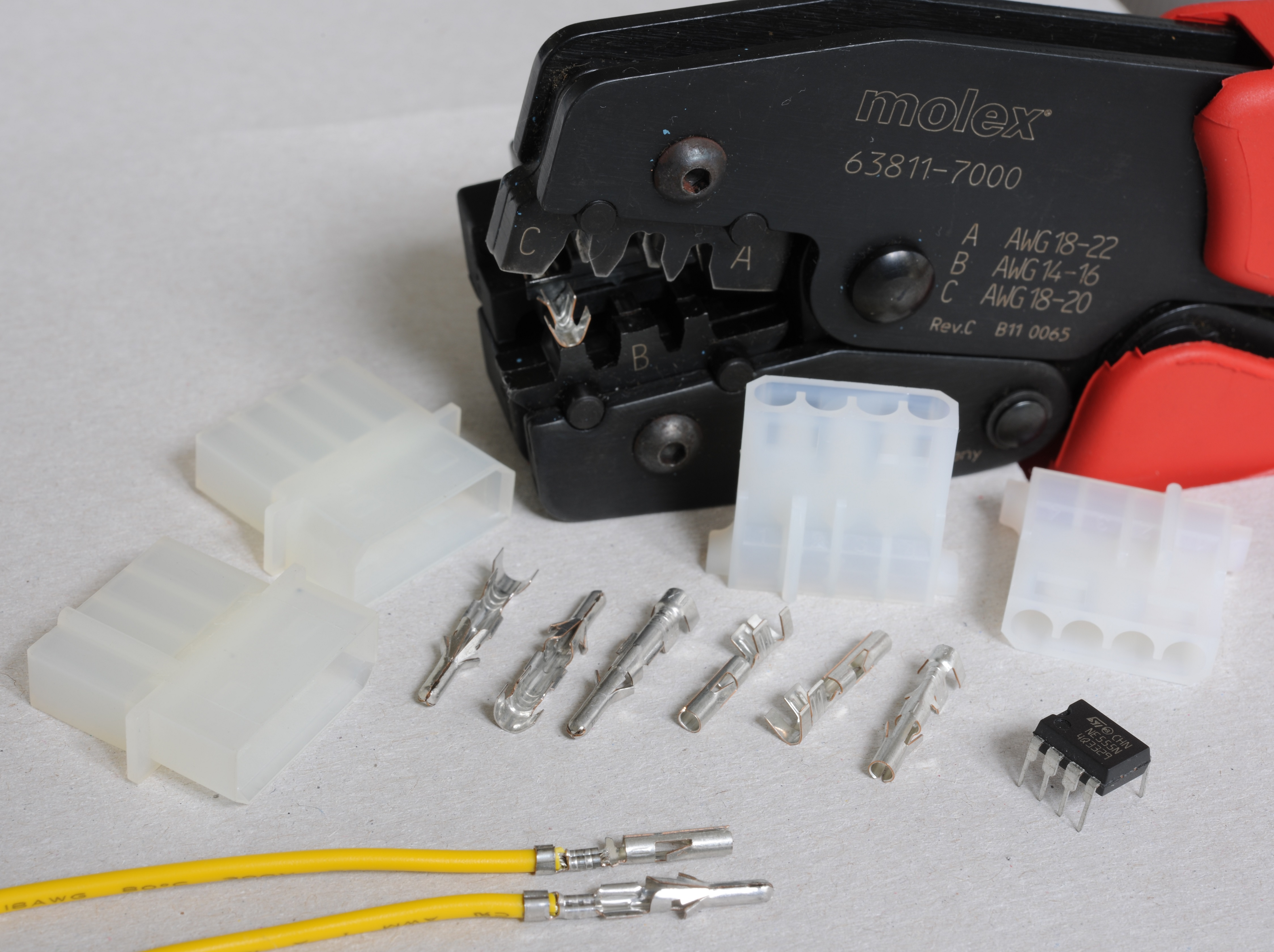
Molex disk drive power connection system tool and connectors

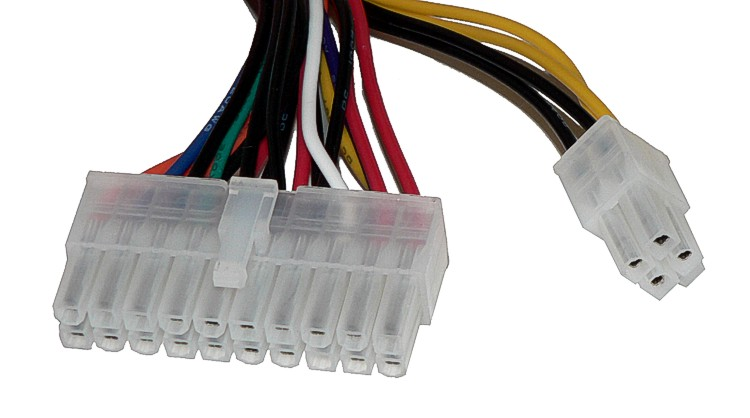
Molex Mini-Fit Jr. connector as used for ATX power supply

A Molex connector is a two-piece pin-and-socket interconnection which became an early electronic standard. Developed by Molex Connector Company in the late 1950s, the design features cylindrical spring-metal pins that fit into cylindrical spring-metal sockets, both held in a rectangular matrix in a nylon shell.

AMP (now TE Connectivity) introduced the Mate-n-Lok connector in October 1963, which was similar to Molex's patented design but not compatible. It featured improvements such as being keyed to prevent incorrect insertion. The Mate-n-Lok connector design led to several connector types that have become established for connecting power in desktop PCs because of their simplicity, reliability, flexibility, and low cost, and is more widely known as a "Molex connector" despite not being from the Molex company.

== History ==
Molex developed and patented the first examples of this connector style in the late 1950s and early 1960s. First used in home appliances, other industries soon began designing it into their products from automobiles to vending machines to minicomputers.

In October 1963, AMP (now TE Connectivity) introduced the Mate-n-Lok connector. The AMP connector was similar to the patented Molex connectors but not interchangeable. Both were widely used in the computer industry and the term "Molex connector" is often used to refer to all nylon plugs and receptacles.

The first 5.25-inch floppy disk drive, the Shugart SA400, introduced in August 1976, used the AMP Mate-n-Lok connector part number 350211-1. This connector became the standard for 5.25-inch format peripherals such as hard drives and was used until introduction of SATA drives. In 1983, Molex introduced the 8981 connector under the trademark Disk Drive Power Connection System, which was fully compatible with the AMP Mate-n-Lok connector. The Molex 8981 series was only produced in a 4-position option, unlike the Mate-n-Lok family which includes many other contact arrangements. The disk drive connector had a 5.08 mm (0.200 in), now obsolete for Molex connectors, spacing between pins. Molex has since discontinued the 8981 series, but the original Mate-n-Lok connectors remain available from TE Connectivity.

== Design ==
In such a connector, cylindrical spring-metal pins fit into cylindrical spring-metal sockets. The pins and sockets are held in a rectangular matrix in a nylon shell. The connector typically has 2 to 24 contacts and is polarized or keyed to ensure correct orientation. Pins and sockets can be arranged in any combination in a single housing, and each housing can be either male or female.

There are three typical pin sizes: 1.57 mm (0.062 in), 2.13 mm (0.084 in), and 2.36 mm (0.093 in). The 1.57 mm pin can carry 5 A of current, while the 2.36 mm can carry 8.5 A. Because the pins have a large contact surface area and fit tightly, these connectors are typically used for power.

These connectors are polarized so that they usually cannot be inserted incorrectly. They lock into position using an integrated latch.

Despite its widespread adoption, the connector has problems. It is difficult to remove because it is held in place by friction instead of a latch, and some poorly constructed connectors may have one or more pins detach from the connector during mating or de-mating. There is also a tendency for the loosely inserted pins on the male connector to skew out of alignment. The female sockets can spread, making the connection imperfect and subject to arcing. Standard practice is to check for any sign of blackening or browning on the white plastic shell, which would indicate the need to replace the arcing connector. In extreme cases the whole connector can melt due to the heat from arcing.

== Uses ==
Certain Molex connectors are used for providing power to the motherboard, fans, floppy disk drive, CD/DVD drive, video card, some older hard drive models, and more. Compatible connectors are available from many manufacturers, not just Molex and AMP.

In 20/24-pin configurations, the Mini-Fit Jr. connector (Molex Mini-fit Jr. 39-28-1203, former 5566-20A or 39-28-1243, former 5566-24A) may be used on ATX motherboards as the main power connector. The same style of connector, in single or paired 4-, 6-, or 8-pin configurations, may be used for additional CPU power and graphics card power. Power delivery to these devices has increased in successive generations of PC components, as their higher signal sophistication and speed requirements have raised their electrical demands. The Mini-Fit Jr. can also be found in other consumer and industrial electric devices, such as major appliances, with high circuit density and high current requirements.

Older AT motherboards use two connectors, commonly referred to as "P8" and "P9" that are positioned directly next to each other. These supply +5 V, +12 V, −5 V, −12 V, "power-good signal", and ground. The most notable difference from modern 20/24-pin ATX power connectors is that the AT power supply connector does not have a signal to turn on the power supply, and also do not supply separate, "always-on" +5 V standby power. The power supply is instead turned on and off via a mechanical switch that disconnects mains power. Modern, ATX supplies, by contrast, are capable of being switched on and off by the computer itself, and the power button is actually a signal that is received by the motherboard and in turn passed along to the power supply. This allows the motherboard to remove power upon shutdown (with the exception of the aforementioned 5 V standby power, which is always on), and also to "wake up" the computer by events such as key presses, mouse clicks, wake-on-LAN events, and scheduled alarm times. These "wakeup" features are often configurable via the BIOS/CMOS setup.

The desktop computer hard-drive connector (AMP Mate-n-Lok 1-480424-0 power connector) is standard on all 5.25-inch floppy drives, 3.5-inch PATA and non-SCA SCSI disk drives; however, newer SATA disk drives employ a more advanced interconnection with 15 contacts. These advanced connection systems were first developed by Molex and other connector companies, often working together to develop interconnection standards. As SATA becomes more prevalent, Molex connectors can be found repurposed, through use of an adaptor, to serve as six-pin PCIe power connectors to make up for a lack of such connectors on a power supply.

Lower power devices (e.g. 3.5-inch floppy drives) use the smaller AMP 171822-4 connector instead.

== See also ==
- Berg connector – Brand of electrical connector used in computer hardware
- JST connector – Standard Japanese electrical connector
- CMOS rechargeable battery – Battery-backed memory component
