= Mini ATX =

Motherboard form factor

ATX motherboard size comparison; rear is on left. FlexATX (229 × 191 mm) MicroATX (244 × 244 mm) Mini ATX (284 × 208 mm) Standard ATX (305 × 244 mm) Extended ATX (EATX) (305 × 330 mm) WTX (356 × 425 mm)

Mini ATX or Mini-ATX is a generic name that may be used by motherboard manufacturers to describe a small motherboard, and has been used by AOPEN in reference to a motherboard design with dimensions 15 × 15 cm (5.9 × 5.9 in).

Mini-ATX motherboards were designed with MoDT (Mobile on Desktop Technology), which adapts mobile CPUs for lower power requirements and less heat generation, which may be beneficial for home theatre PCs (HTPC), in-car PCs, or industrial use, before being abandoned in v2.1 in favor of the MicroATX specification.

Mini-ATX motherboards are no longer used, due to MicroATX surpassing its features, and manufacturers no longer produce motherboards in this form factor.

== Alternative definition ==
The term Mini-ATX was originally used in (now obsolete versions of) Intel's ATX specification, and denoted motherboards with dimensions of 284 x 208 mm (11.2 x 8.2 in.). The two terms refer to different specifications and should not be conflated.

== Features ==
=== Size ===
With dimensions of 15 × 15 cm (5.9 × 5.9 in), an AOPEN-spec Mini-ATX motherboard can be placed into a single DIN space for standardized application conditions such as a car, rack mount, tower case, wall mount, etc., which may be impossible for the larger Mini-ITX form factor. The smaller form factor Nano-ITX motherboard lacks a CPU socket module, which limits its flexibility for different applications.

=== Noise ===
Due to a mobile CPU having lower power requirements, there is less heat generated by the CPU and internal components, and the thermal design is simplified. With its cooling design, the manufacturing costs and overall operating power requirements are lower relative to active cooling designs.

=== Stability ===
Mini-ATX motherboards are a smaller form factor of the ATX motherboards. It typically uses surface-mount technology for component placement, solid state capacitors to ensure stable power delivery, and an 8-layer PCB design to increase durability and longevity. This design is aimed to provide a better overall performance and reliability compared to other form factors.

=== Flexibility ===
The DC-to-DC converter solution design removes the power supply unit from a Mini-ATX case. This reduces the system size, and an external power supply unit brings more flexibility when deploying system.
