= WTX (form factor) =

Motherboard form factor specification

ATX motherboard size comparison; rear is on left. FlexATX (229 × 191 mm) microATX (244 × 244 mm) Mini ATX (284 × 208 mm) Standard ATX (305 × 244 mm) Extended ATX (EATX) (305 × 330 mm) WTX (356 × 425 mm)

WTX (for Workstation Technology Extended) was a motherboard form factor specification introduced by Intel at the IDF in September 1998, for its use at high-end, multiprocessor, multiple-hard-disk servers and workstations. The specification had support from major OEMs (Compaq, Dell, Fujitsu, Gateway, Hewlett-Packard, IBM, Intergraph, NEC, Siemens Nixdorf, and UMAX) and motherboard manufacturers (Acer, Asus, Supermicro and Tyan) and was updated (1.1) in February 1999. As of 2008, the specification has been discontinued and the URL www.wtx.org no longer hosts a website and has not been owned by Intel since at least 2004.

This form factor was geared specifically towards the needs of high-end systems, and included specifications for a WTX power supply unit (PSU) using two WTX-specific 24-pin and 22-pin Molex connectors.

The WTX specification was created to standardize a new motherboard and chassis form factor, fix the relative processor location, and allow for high volume airflow through a portion of the chassis where the processors are positioned. This allowed for standard form factor motherboards and chassis to be used to integrate processors with more demanding thermal management requirements.

Bigger than ATX, maximum WTX motherboard size was 14 × 16.75 in (356 × 425 mm). This was intended to provide more room in order to accommodate higher numbers of integrated components.

WTX computer cases were backwards compatible with ATX motherboards (but not vice versa), and sometimes came equipped with ATX power supplies.

== See also ==
- eATX: a version of ATX which has a form factor of 304.8 × 330.2 mm (12 × 13 in).
- SWTX: Server Workstation Technology Extended
