= Power good signal =

Signal indicating voltage stability

The Power Good signal (power-good) is a signal provided by a computer power supply unit to indicate to the motherboard that all of the voltages are within specification and that the system may proceed to boot and operate.

== ATX Power Good ==
The ATX specification defines the Power-Good signal as a +5-volt (V) signal generated in the power supply when it has passed its internal self-tests and the outputs have stabilized. This normally takes between 0.1 and 0.5 seconds after the power supply is switched on. The signal is then sent to the motherboard, where it is received by the processor timer chip that controls the reset line to the processor.

The ATX specification requires that the power-good signal ("PWR_OK") go high no sooner than 100 ms after the power rails have stabilized, and remain high for 16 ms after loss of AC power, and fall (to less than 0.4 V) at least 1 ms before the power rails fall out of specification (to 95% of their nominal value).

Cheaper and/or lower quality power supplies do not follow the ATX specification of a separate monitoring circuit; they instead wire the power good output to one of the 5 V lines. This means the processor will never reset given bad power unless the 5 V line drops low enough to turn off the trigger, which could be too low for proper operation.

== Power Good values ==
Power good value is based on the delay in ms, that a power supply takes to become fully ready. Power good values are often considered abnormal if detected lower than 100 ms or higher than 500 ms.
