= Berg connector =

Brand of electrical connector used in computer hardware

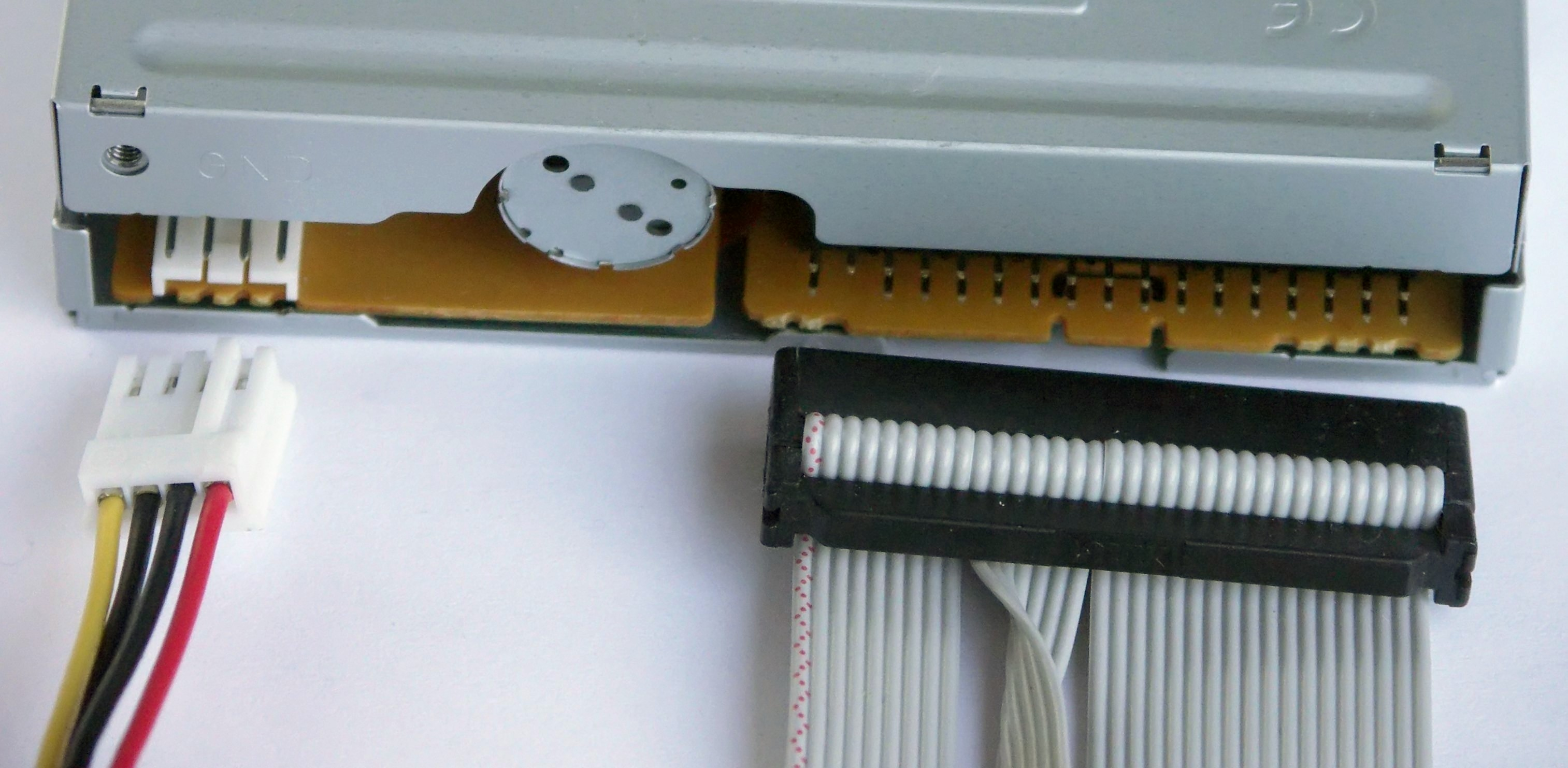
Rear side of 3.5-inch floppy drive. Berg connector for power is shown on the left; data cable on right.

Berg connector is a brand of electrical connector used in computer hardware. Berg connectors are manufactured by Berg Electronics Corporation of St. Louis, Missouri, now part of Amphenol.

== Overview ==
Berg connectors usually have a pitch of 2.54 mm (0.100 in). Pins are 0.64 mm (0.025 in) square, and usually come as single or double row connectors.

Many types of Berg connectors exist. Some of the more familiar ones used in IBM PC compatibles are:

- the four-pin polarized Berg connectors used to connect 3½-inch floppy disk drive units to the power supply unit, usually referred to as simply a "floppy power connector", but often also referred to as LP4. This connector has a 2.50 mm (0.098 in) pitch (not 2.54 mm).
- the two-pin Berg connectors used to connect the front panel lights, turbo switch, and reset button to the motherboard.
- the two-pin Berg connectors used as jumpers for motherboard configuration.

== Floppy drive power connector ==
Floppy Drive Power Connector
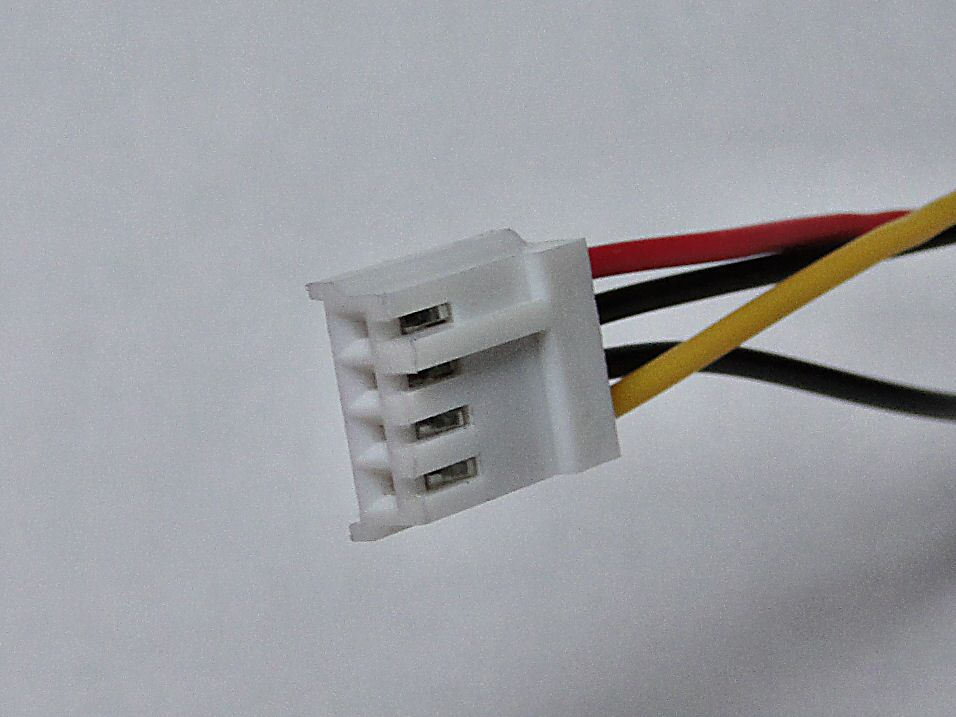
- Type: Electrical

Production history
- Designer: Berg Electronics Corporation

General specifications
- Pins: 4

Electrical
- Signal: Yes

Pinout
Pin	Color	Type
Pin 1	Red	+5 V
Pin 2	Black	Ground
Pin 3	Black	Ground
Pin 4	Yellow	+12 V

The power connector on the 3½-inch floppy drive, informally known as "the Berg connector", is 2.50 mm pitch (distance from center to center of pins).

The power cable from the ATX power supply consists of 20 AWG wire to a 4-pin female connector. The plastic connector housing is most often white, as shown (TE Connectivity / AMP 171822-4), but black is also common. Other colours are rarer. The part numbers used for the female contact pins depends on the detailed design, the surface coating (for example tinned or gold plated) and the form of supply. Example part numbers are any of TE Connectivity / AMP 170204-* (loose pieces) or 170262-* (pieces supplied in strips), where * is 1 or 2 or 4.

The male PCB connector on the 3½-inch floppy drive is normally a polarized right-angle male header, which is a TE Connectivity / AMP 171826-4, the straight model is AMP 171825-4.

The shape of the connector housing makes it very easy to determine the pin number allocations by visual inspection.

== Company history ==
In 1998, Berg Electronics was acquired by FCI (Framatome Connectors International) for $1.85 billion. In 2016, FCI Asia Pte was acquired by Amphenol.

== See also ==
- DC connector
- Insulation-displacement connector (IDC)
- JST connector
- Molex connector
- Pin header connector
