= Vectura =

British pharmaceuticals company

Vectura Group Limited
- Company type: Subsidiary
- Industry: Pharmaceuticals
- Founded: 1997; 29 years ago
- Headquarters: Chippenham, England, UK
- Number of locations: 5 (in 2019)
- Key people: Bruno Angelici, Chairman; Michael Austwick, (CEO)
- Revenue: ▲£190.6 million (2020)
- Operating income: ▲£132.8 million (2020)
- Net income: ▲£122.4 million (2020)
- Number of employees: 450 (2021)
- Parent: Molex Inc.
- Website: www.vectura.com

Vectura Group Limited is a British pharmaceuticals company based in Chippenham, England which develops inhaled medicines and makes inhaler devices. It was listed on the London Stock Exchange (LSE) until it was acquired by Philip Morris International in September 2021.

On 7 January 2025, Molex Inc. announced that it had completed the purchase of the company through an affiliate.

== History ==
Vectura was formed in 1997 at the University of Bath as a start-up pharmaceuticals business. In 1999 it acquired Co-ordinated Drug Development and the Centre for Drug Formulation Studies. The company moved from the university campus to a site at Chippenham, Wiltshire in 2002.

In 2006, two years after being listed on the Alternative Investment Market, Vectura acquired Innovata Biomed plc, another developer of pulmonary products, and then moved onto the full list of the LSE. It acquired Activaero, a German manufacturer in the same sector, for £108 million in March 2014.

In June 2016, Vectura completed a £441 million merger with Skyepharma, a maker of devices such as asthma inhalers; it was stated that the merged company would continue to be known as Vectura.

The former Skyepharma manufacturing plant at Lyon, France, makes various oral products including tablets. After Vectura decided to concentrate on inhaled products, in June 2021 the company supported a buy-out of the site by its management, with finance from Bpifrance.

In July 2021, American tobacco company Philip Morris International made an offer to buy Vectura for £1 billion. The Carlyle Group, an American private equity firm, also submitted an offer which was £44m lower. The board subsequently accepted the offer from Philip Morris International and, in September, it confirmed that circa 75% of shareholders had supported the takeover. The takeover by Philip Morris was widely condemned.

In September 2024, it was announced that the firm had agreed to be acquired by Molex Inc. in an all-cash deal valued at £150 million. Four months later, Molex Inc. reported having completed the transaction.

== Operations ==
Vectura is a developer of inhaled therapies for the treatment of respiratory diseases. Since 2019, it has operated as a contract development and manufacturing organization (CDMO), helping other companies bring inhaled medicines to market.

The headquarters and development facility at Chippenham, England, on a mixed industrial site on the outskirts of the town, employed around 250 as of 2022. There are also development sites at Cambridge, Muttenz (Basel, Switzerland) and Gauting (Germany). There are plans for a new research & development building at the Bristol and Bath Science Park, not far from Chippenham, which could open in 2025.
