= FlexATX =

Motherboard form factor

ATX motherboard size comparison; rear is on left. FlexATX (229 × 191 mm) microATX (244 × 244 mm) Mini ATX (284 × 208 mm) Standard ATX (305 × 244 mm) Extended ATX (EATX) (305 × 330 mm) WTX (356 × 425 mm)

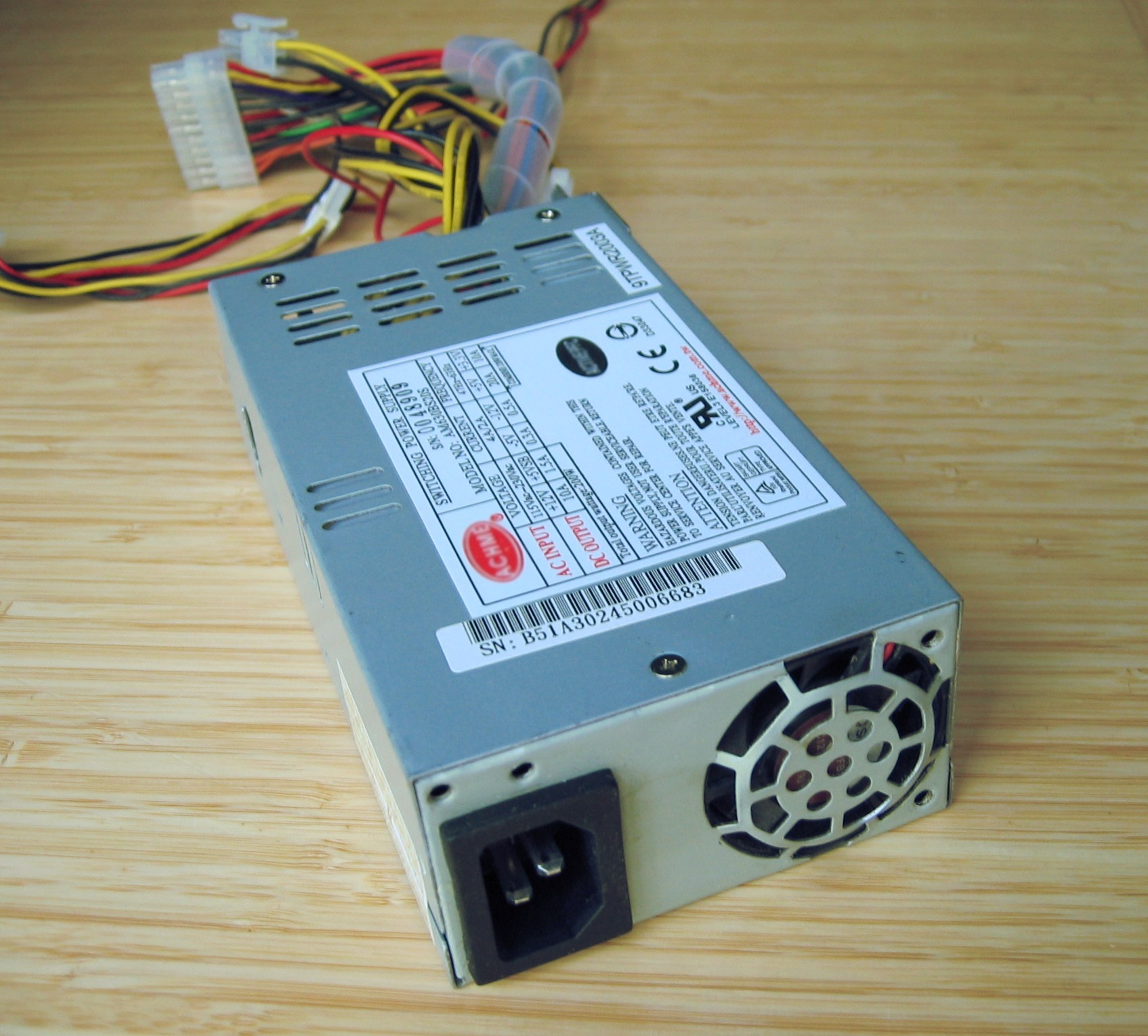
FlexATX PSU

FlexATX is a motherboard form factor derived from ATX. The specification was released in 1999 by Intel as an addendum to the microATX specification. It uses a subset of the motherboard mounting holes required for microATX and the same I/O plate system as ATX and microATX.

FlexATX specifies that a motherboard be no larger than 9 × 7.5 in (229 × 191 mm), and can have no more than three expansion slots.

The term is used also for the form factor of a power supply unit (PSU) that is smaller than a standard ATX PSU and is used in small cases that host a FlexATX or Mini-ITX motherboard or in thin rackmount servers such as 1U racks.
