= Climate Savers Computing Initiative =

Computers and the environment group

The Climate Savers Computing Initiative was a nonprofit group of consumers, businesses and conservation organizations dedicated to promoting smart technologies that improve power efficiency and reduce energy consumption of computers. Formed in 2007, it was based in Portland, Oregon. In July 2012, Climate Savers Computing Initiative combined with The Green Grid and its programs continue within that organization.

Participating manufacturers committed to producing products that meet specified power-efficiency targets, and members committed to purchasing power-efficient computing products.

By 2010, the initiative sought to reduce energy consumption by computers by 50 percent and reduce global CO_{2} emissions from the operation of computers by 54 million tons a year.

== Goal ==
The goal of the new environmental effort was to save energy and reduce greenhouse gas emissions by setting targets for energy-efficient computers and components, and promoting the adoption of energy-efficient computers and power management tools globally.

The typical desktop PC wastes more than half of the power it draws from a power outlet. Servers typically waste 30-40% of the power they consume. This energy is wasted as heat. As a result, offices, homes, and data centers have increased demands on air conditioning which in turn increases energy requirements and associated costs.

By increasing the effectiveness of power-management features in computers as well as implementing these features and aggressive power-management policies, the average business desktop can save 60% of the electricity consumed, with no compromise to productivity. These results combat climate change and cut costs. With individual member and company participation, this effort worked toward a 50% reduction in power consumption by computers by 2010, and committed participants aimed to collectively save $5.5 billion in energy costs and 54 million tons of CO_{2} emissions a year. That would be the equivalent of taking 11 million cars off the road every year.

Participants in the Climate Savers Computing Initiative represented both the demand and supply side of the computer industry, including computer manufacturers and chip makers, as well as environmental groups, energy companies, retailers, government agencies and more. Supporters of the initiative included Intel Corporation, Google, Dell, EDS, the United States Environmental Protection Agency (EPA), Hewlett-Packard, Lenovo, Microsoft, Pacific Gas and Electric Company (PG&E), World Wildlife Fund and others.

== Specifications ==
The Climate Savers Computing Initiative operated in a manner similar to the U.S. Government's Energy Star program. It was intended to promote both the deployment of existing technologies and investment in new energy-efficiency technologies. The Energy Star 4.0 standard for desktops, laptops, and workstations, which took effect in July 2007, requires power supplies to be at least 80 percent efficient for most of their load range. In addition, it puts limits on the energy used by devices when inactive and requires systems to be shipped with power management features enabled.

=== PCs ===
The Initiative started with the 2007 Energy Star requirements for desktops, laptops and workstations (including monitors), and gradually increased the efficiency requirements over the next four years, as follows:

1. From July 2007 through June 2008, PCs must have met the Energy Star requirements. This means 80 percent minimum efficiency for the power supply unit (PSU) at 20 percent, 50 percent, and 100 percent of rated output, a power factor of at least 0.9 at 100 percent of rated output, and meeting the maximum power requirements in standby, sleep, and idle modes.
2. From July 2008 through June 2009 the standard increased to 85 percent minimum efficiency for the PSU at 50 percent of rated output (and 82 percent minimum efficiency at 20 percent and 100 percent of rated output). Equivalent to 80 Plus Bronze level.
3. From July 2009 through June 2010, the standard increased to 88 percent minimum efficiency for the PSU at 50 percent of rated output (and 85 percent minimum efficiency at 20 percent and 100 percent of rated output). Equivalent to 80 Plus Silver level.
4. From July 2010 through June 2011, the standard increased to 90 percent minimum efficiency for the PSU at 50 percent of rated output (and 87 percent minimum efficiency at 20 percent and 100 percent of rated output). Equivalent to 80 Plus Gold level.

=== Servers ===
In addition, the Initiative set the following high-efficiency targets for volume servers (1U/2U single- and dual-socket servers):

1. From July 2007 through June 2008, volume servers must have had 85 percent minimum efficiency for the power supply unit (PSU) at 50 percent of rated output (and 81 percent minimum efficiency at 20 percent and 100 percent of rated output), and power factor of at least 0.9 at 100 percent of rated output.
2. From July 2008 through June 2009 the standard increased to 89 percent minimum efficiency for the PSU at 50 percent of rated output (and 85 percent minimum efficiency at 20 percent and 100 percent of rated output).
3. From July 2009 through June 2010, the standard increased to 92 percent minimum efficiency for the PSU at 50 percent of rated output (and 88 percent minimum efficiency at 20 percent and 100 percent of rated output.

== Relationship with The Green Grid ==
On July 19, 2012 Climate Savers Computing Initiative and The Green Grid announced a joining of the two organizations resulting in Climate Savers Computing Initiative's programs and membership being moved under The Green Grid brand to build on TGG's success in improving resource efficiency in information technology and data centers. TGG and CSCI fused their separate but closely aligned resources together to accelerate the implementation of energy efficiency and sustainability within the IT and communications industries.

== See also ==
- 80 Plus
- Energy Star
- Green computing
- Power management
