= Molex =

Manufacturing company, subsidiary of Koch Industries

Molex, LLC
- Type: Subsidiary
- Traded as: Nasdaq: MOLX
- Industry: Electronics
- Founded: 1938; 88 years ago
- Headquarters: Lisle, Illinois, United States
- Products: Electrical connectors, Molex connector, Optical fiber connectors, Switches
- Revenue: $3.6bn (June 30, 2013)
- Net income: $243m (June 30, 2013)
- Number of employees: 45,000
- Parent: Koch Industries
- Subsidiaries: Smiths Interconnect
- Website: www.molex.com

Molex, LLC is a manufacturer of electronic, electrical, and fiber optic connectivity systems. Molex produces over 100,000 products for a variety of industries, including data communications, medical, industrial, automotive and consumer electronics. They are notable for pioneering their Molex connector, which has seen universal adoption in personal computing. The company is considered the second largest electronic connector company in the world.

Molex at 9th Bengaluru Space Expo 2026, BIEC

== History ==
Molex was established in 1938 by Frederick Krehbiel. The company began by making flowerpots out of an industrial byproduct plastic called Molex. Krehbiel developed this material by combining asbestos tailings, coal tar pitch, and limestone. Aside from flower pots, Molex also sold salt shakers before it expanded into electrical connectors and sensors. Later they made connectors for General Electric and other appliance manufacturers out of the same plastic. Molex acquired Woodhead Industries in 2006; the largest acquisition in the former's history at the time.

On February 14, 2005, Molex announced its results for the six months ended December 31, 2004, that reflect certain adjustments to its results of operations for the first fiscal quarter ended September 30, 2004. In March 2005, a class action lawsuit against Molex Inc. and certain of its officers and directors for artificially inflating the market price through materially false and misleading statements was announced. In 2007, a settlement of $10.5 million fund plus interest was reached.

In 2009, Hermann Simon mentioned this company as an example of a "Hidden Champion". During this period, Molex already operated 59 manufacturing plants all over the world, posting a sustained 12% annual growth rate. Following another expansion strategy, the company started producing complex, three-dimensional electronic components for medical applications in 2011.

In September 2013, Koch Industries purchased Molex for $7.2 billion. Koch indicated Molex will retain its company name and headquarters in Lisle, Illinois, and be run as a subsidiary.

In November 2016, Molex acquired the Wisconsin-based Phillips Medisize. As a private equity investment firm, Phillips Medisize specializes in plastic injection molding and the manufacture of medical instruments. Phillips Medisize incorporates a wide variety of products and services, including drug delivery, mobile and portable medical devices, and primary pharmaceutical packaging and diagnostic products. Employing 5,400 people around that time in 21 locations worldwide, Phillips Medisize operates as an indirect subsidiary of Molex.

In October 2025, Molex acquired Smiths Interconnect, which produces connector devices for rugged environments, from Smiths Group in a deal valued at 1.3 billion pounds ($1.75 billion). The deal was completed in April 2026.

Further acquisitions in pharmaceuticals included Vectura, a British maker of inhalation drug delivery devices, effective January 2025.
