= Motherboard form factor =

Indication of size and mounting options of a computer or its components

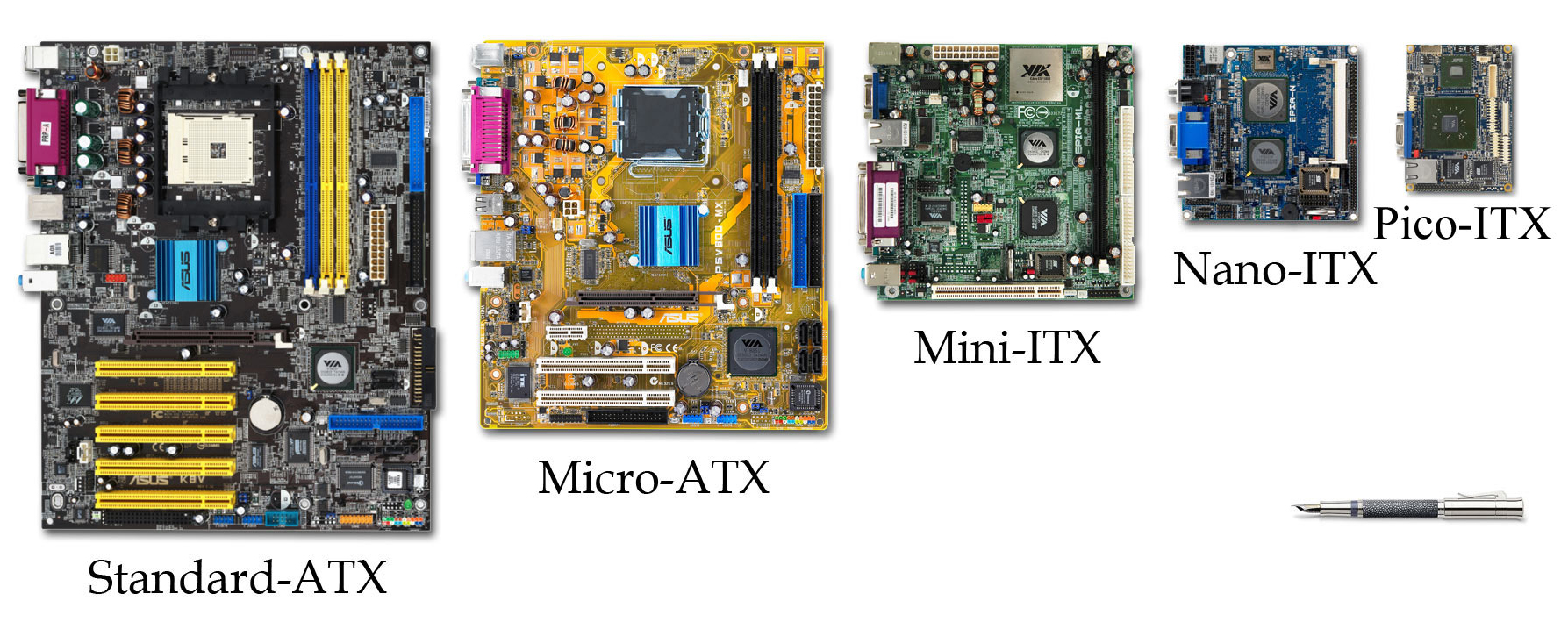
Comparison of some common motherboard form factors (pen for scale)

In computing, the form factor of a motherboard is a specification of its dimensions, as well as power supply type, location of mounting holes, number of ports on the back panel, etc. Specifically, in the IBM PC compatible industry, standard form factors ensure that parts are interchangeable across competing vendors and generations of technology, while in enterprise computing, form factors ensure that server modules fit into existing rackmount systems. Traditionally, the most significant specification is for that of the motherboard, which generally dictates the overall size of the case. Small form factors have been developed and implemented.

== Overview of form factors ==
A PC motherboard is the main circuit board within a typical desktop computer, laptop or server. Its main functions are as follows:

- To serve as a central backbone to which all other modular parts such as CPU, RAM, and hard drives can be attached as required to create a computer
- To be interchangeable (in most cases) with different components (in particular CPU and expansion cards) for the purposes of customization and upgrading
- To distribute power to other circuit boards
- To electronically co-ordinate and interface the operation of the components

As new generations of components have been developed, the standards of motherboards have changed too. For example, the introduction of AGP and, more recently, PCI Express have influenced motherboard design. However, the standardized size and layout of motherboards have changed much more slowly and are controlled by their own standards. The list of components required on a motherboard changes far more slowly than the components themselves. For example, north bridge microchips have changed many times since their introduction with many manufacturers bringing out their own versions, but in terms of form factor standards, provisions for north bridges have remained fairly static for many years.

Although it is a slower process, form factors do evolve regularly in response to changing demands. IBM's long-standing standard, AT (Advanced Technology), was superseded in 1995 by the current industry standard ATX (Advanced Technology Extended), which still governs the size and design of the motherboard in most modern PCs. The latest update to the ATX standard was released in 2007. A divergent standard by chipset manufacturer VIA called EPIA (also known as ITX, and not to be confused with EPIC) is based upon smaller form factors and its own standards.

Differences between form factors are most apparent in terms of their intended market sector, and involve variations in size, design compromises and typical features. Most modern computers have very similar requirements, so form factor differences tend to be based upon subsets and supersets of these. For example, a desktop computer may require more sockets for maximum flexibility and many optional connectors and other features on board, whereas a computer to be used in a multimedia system may need to be optimized for heat and size, with additional plug-in cards being less common. The smallest motherboards may sacrifice CPU flexibility in favor of a fixed manufacturer's choice. The E-ATX form factor is not standardized and may vary according to the motherboard manufacturer.

== Comparisons ==
=== Tabular information ===
| Form factor | Originated | Date | Max. size (Note: For boards which take expansion slots, the length of the expansion card aligns with the depth of the system board. The case may support cards longer than the depth of the mainboard.) width × depth | Notes (typical usage, Market adoption, etc.) |
|---|---|---|---|---|
| XT | IBM | 1983 | 216 × 279 mm (8.5 × 11 in) | Obsolete, see Industry Standard Architecture. The IBM Personal Computer XT was the successor to the original IBM PC, its first home computer. As the specifications were open, many clone motherboards were produced and it became a de facto standard. |
| AT (Advanced Technology) | IBM | 1984 | 305 × 279–330 mm (12 × 11–13 in) | Obsolete, see Industry Standard Architecture. Created by IBM for the IBM Personal Computer/AT, an Intel 80286 machine. Also known as Full AT, it was popular during the era of the Intel 80386 microprocessor. Superseded by ATX. |
| Baby-AT | IBM | 1985 | 216 × 254–330 mm (8.5 × 10–13 in) | IBM's 1985 successor to the AT motherboard. Functionally equivalent to the AT, it became popular due to its significantly smaller size. |
| ATX | Intel | 1995 | 305 × 244 mm (12 × 9.6 in) | Created by Intel in 1995. As of 2017, it is the most popular form factor for commodity motherboards. Typical size is 9.6 × 12 in although some companies extend that to 10 × 12 in. |
| SSI CEB | SSI | ? | 305 × 267 mm (12 × 10.5 in) | Created by the Server System Infrastructure (SSI) forum. Derived from the EEB and ATX specifications. This means that SSI CEB motherboards have the same mounting holes and the same IO connector area as ATX motherboards. |
| SSI EEB | SSI | ? | 305 × 330 mm (12 × 13 in) | Created by the Server System Infrastructure (SSI) forum. Derived from the EEB and ATX specifications. This means that SSI CEB motherboards have the same mounting holes and the same IO connector area as ATX motherboards, but SSI EEB motherboards do not. |
| SSI MEB | SSI | ? | 411 × 330 mm (16.2 × 13 in) | Created by the Server System Infrastructure (SSI) forum. Derived from the EEB and ATX specifications. |
| microATX | Intel | 1996 | 244 × 244 mm (9.6 × 9.6 in) | A 20 % shorter variant of the ATX form factor. Compatible with most ATX cases, but has fewer slots than ATX, for a smaller power supply unit. Very popular for desktop and small form factor computers as of 2017. |
| Mini-ATX | Intel | 1995 or 1996 | 284 × 208 mm (11.2 × 8.2 in) | ATX boards measure 12″ × 9.6″, which allows cutting two boards per 24″ × 18″ panel. In order to fit four boards per panel, Mini-ATX, which measures 11.2″ × 8.2″, may be used. Estimated to reduce cost of the board by approximately 30%. Removed from the ATX specification in version 2.1 Many so-called ATX boards are actually Mini-ATX. |
| Mini-ATX | AOpen | 2005 | 150 × 150 mm (5.9 × 5.9 in) | Mini-ATX is considerably smaller than Micro-ATX. Mini-ATX motherboards were designed with MoDT (Mobile on Desktop Technology) which adapt mobile CPUs for lower power requirement, less heat generation and better application capability. |
| FlexATX | Intel | 1999 | 228.6 × 190.5 mm max (9.0 × 7.5 in) | A subset of microATX developed by Intel in 1999. Allows more flexible motherboard design, component positioning and shape. Smaller than regular microATX. |
| Mini-ITX | VIA | 2001 | 170 × 170 mm max (6.7 × 6.7 in) | A small, highly integrated form factor, designed for small devices such as thin clients and set-top boxes. |
| Nano-ITX | VIA | 2003 | 120 × 120 mm (4.7 × 4.7 in) | Targeted at smart digital entertainment devices such as PVRs, set-top boxes, media centers and Car PCs, and thin devices. |
| Pico-ITX | VIA | 2007 | 100 × 72 mm max (3.9 × 2.8 in) | |
| Mobile-ITX | VIA | 2007 | 75 × 45 mm (2.953 × 1.772 in) | |
| Neo-ITX | VIA | 2012 | 170 × 85 × 35 mm (6.69 × 3.33 × 1.38 in) | Used in the VIA Android PC |
| Deep Mini-ITX | ASRock Rack | ? | 170 × 208 mm max (6.7 × 8.2 in) | Proprietary Mini-ITX variant i.a. for more than two memory slots, designed for chassis with support for Micro-ATX size and above |
| Mini-STX | Intel | 2015 | 147 × 140 mm (5.79 × 5.51 in) | Smaller than Mini-ITX, but bigger than the NUC, this board is used in small form factor computers, using a socketed intel core processor and SO-DIMMS. |
| BTX (Balanced Technology Extended) | Intel | 2004 | 325 × 267 mm max (12.8 × 10.5 in) | A standard proposed by Intel as a successor to ATX in the early 2000s, according to Intel the layout has better cooling. BTX Boards are flipped in comparison to ATX Boards, so a BTX or MicroBTX Board needs a BTX case, while an ATX style board fits in an ATX case. The RAM slots and the PCI slots are parallel to each other. Processor is placed closest to the fan. May contain a CNR board. |
| MicroBTX (or uBTX) | Intel | 2004 | 264 × 267 mm max (10.4 × 10.5 in) | MicroBTX (also called uBTX) is a computer motherboard form factor. A microBTX is 10.4 × 10.5 in (264 × 267 mm) and can support up to four expansion slots. |
| DTX | AMD | 2007 | 200 × 244 mm max (8.0 × 9.6 in) | DTX backward compatible with ATX cases. Shorter variant, Mini-DTX (mDTX) of 8 × 6.7 inches (203 × 170 mm) |
| smartModule | Digital-Logic | ? | 66 × 85 mm (2.60 × 3.35 in) | Used in embedded systems and single-board computers. Requires a baseboard. |
| ETX | Kontron | 1999 | 95 × 114 mm (3.74 × 4.49 in) | Used in embedded systems and single-board computers. Requires a baseboard. |
| COM Express Basic | PICMG | 2005 | 95 × 125 mm (3.74 × 4.9 in) | Used in embedded systems and single-board computers. Requires a carrier board. |
| COM Express Compact | PICMG | 2005 | 95 × 95 mm (3.74 × 3.74 in) | Used in embedded systems and single-board computers. Requires a carrier board. |
| COM Express Mini | PICMG | 2005 | 55 × 84 mm (2.17 × 3.31 in) | Used in embedded systems and single-board computers. Requires a carrier board. Adheres to pin-out Type 10 |
| COM-HPC Size A | PICMG | 2020 | 95 × 120 mm (3.7 × 4.7 in) | Used in embedded systems. Requires a carrier board. Typically used for COM-HPC Client Type modules. |
| COM-HPC Size B | PICMG | 2020 | 120 × 120 mm (4.7 × 4.7 in) | Used in embedded systems. Requires a carrier board. Typically used for COM-HPC Client Type modules. |
| COM-HPC Size C | PICMG | 2020 | 160 × 120 mm (6.3 × 4.7 in) | Used in embedded systems. Requires a carrier board. Typically used for COM-HPC Client Type modules with multiple SODIMM memory sockets. |
| COM-HPC Size D | PICMG | 2020 | 160 × 160 mm (6.3 × 6.3 in) | Used in embedded systems. Requires a carrier board. Typically used for COM-HPC Server Type modules with 4x full size DIMM memory sockets. |
| COM-HPC Size E | PICMG | 2020 | 200 × 160 mm (7.9 × 6.3 in) | Used in embedded systems. Requires a carrier board. Typically used for COM-HPC Server Type modules with 8x full size DIMM memory sockets. |
| CoreExpress | SFF-SIG | ? | 58 × 65 mm (2.28 × 2.56 in) | Used in embedded systems and single-board computers. Requires a carrier board. |
| Extended ATX (EATX) | Unknown | ? | 305 × 330 mm (12 × 13 in) | Used in rackmount server systems. Typically used for server-class type motherboards with dual processors and too much circuitry for a standard ATX motherboard. The mounting hole pattern for the upper portion of the board matches ATX. |
| Enhanced Extended ATX (EEATX) | Supermicro | ? | 347 × 330 mm (13.68 × 13 in) | Used in rackmount server systems. Typically used for server-class type motherboards with dual processors and too much circuitry for a standard E.ATX motherboard. |
| LPX | Western Digital | ? | 229 × 279–330 mm (9 × 11–13 in) | Based on a design by Western Digital, it allowed smaller cases than the AT standard, by putting the expansion card slots on a Riser card. Used in slimline retail PCs. LPX was never standardized and generally only used by large OEMs. |
| Mini-LPX | Western Digital | ? | 203–229 × 254–279 mm (8–9 × 10–11 in) | Used in slimline retail PCs. |
| PC/104 | PC/104 Consortium | 1992 | 97 × 91 mm (3.8 × 3.6 in) | Used in embedded systems. AT Bus (ISA) architecture adapted to vibration-tolerant header connectors. |
| PC/104-Plus | PC/104 Consortium | 1997 | 97 × 91 mm (3.8 × 3.6 in) | Used in embedded systems. PCI Bus architecture adapted to vibration-tolerant header connectors. |
| PCI/104-Express | PC/104 Consortium | 2008 | 97 × 91 mm (3.8 × 3.6 in) | Used in embedded systems. PCI Express architecture adapted to vibration-tolerant header connectors. |
| PCIe/104 | PC/104 Consortium | 2008 | 97 × 91 mm (3.8 × 3.6 in) | Used in embedded systems. PCI/104-Express without the legacy PCI bus. |
| NLX | Intel | 1999 | 203–229 × 254–345 mm (8–9 × 10–13.6 in) | A low-profile design released in 1997. It also incorporated a riser for expansion cards, and never became popular. |
| UTX | TQ-Components | 2001 | 88 × 108 mm (3.46 × 4.25 in) | Used in embedded systems and IPCs. Requires a baseboard. |
| WTX | Intel | 1998 | 355.6 × 425.4 mm (14 × 16.75 in) | A large design for servers and high-end workstations featuring multiple CPUs and hard drives. |
| SWTX | Supermicro | ? | 418 × 330 mm (16.48 × 13 in) | A proprietary design for servers and high-end workstations featuring multiple CPUs. |
| HPTX | EVGA | 2008 | 345 × 381 mm (13.6 × 15 in) | A large design by EVGA currently featured on two motherboards; the eVGA SR2 and SRX. Intended for use with multiple CPUs. Cases require 9 expansion slots to contain this form-factor. |
| XTX | Ampro / Congatec | 2005 | 95 × 114 mm (3.74 × 4.49 in) | Used in embedded systems. Requires a base. |
| YTX | Asus, MSI & Maxsun | 2023 | 175 × 245 mm (6.89 × 9.65 in) | New form factor supporting the DIY-APE initiative |

=== Size variants ===
| Form factor | Originated | Date | Max. size (Note: For boards which take expansion slots, the length of the expansion card aligns with the depth of the system board. The case may support cards longer than the depth of the mainboard.) width × depth | Slots | Notes (typical usage, Market adoption, etc.) |
|---|---|---|---|---|---|
| ATX | Intel | 1995 | 12 × 9.6 in (305 × 244 mm) | 7 | Original, successor to AT motherboard |
| Proprietary, specific to crypto-mining specific motherboards | Unknown | 2011 | 12 × 8 in (305 × 203 mm) | 3 | 3 double-slot add-in cards with 1 slots of free space in between |
| SSI CEB | SSI | ? | 12 × 10.5 in (305 × 267 mm) | 7 | Compact Electronics Bay |
| SSI MEB | SSI | 2011 | 16.2 × 13 in (411 × 330 mm) | 12 | Midrange Electronics Bay |
| SSI EEB | SSI | ? | 12 × 13 in (305 × 330 mm) | 7 | Enterprise Electronics Bay |
| SSI TEB | SSI | ? | 12 × 10.5 in (305 × 267 mm) | 7 | Thin Electronics Bay, for rack-mount, has board component height specification |
| microATX | Intel | 1997 | 9.6 × 9.6 in (244 × 244 mm) | 4 | Fits in ATX, and EATX cases. |
| FlexATX | Intel | 1997 | 9 × 7.5 in (229 × 191 mm) | 3 | |
| Extended ATX (standard) | Supermicro / Asus | ? | 12 × 13 in (305 × 330 mm) | 7 | Screw holes not completely compatible with some ATX cases. Designed for dual CPUs, and quad double slot video cards. |
| Extended ATX (commonly) | Unknown | ? | 12 × 10.1 in (305 × 257 mm); 12 × 10.4 in (305 × 264 mm); 12 × 10.5 in (305 × 267 mm); 12 × 10.7 in (305 × 272 mm) | 7 | ATX pattern screw holes |
| EE-ATX | Supermicro | ? | 13.68 × 13 in (347 × 330 mm) | 7 | Enhanced Extended ATX |
| Ultra ATX | Foxconn | 2008 | 14.4 × 9.6 in (366 × 244 mm) | 10 | Intended for multiple double-slot video cards, and dual CPUs. |
| XL-ATX | EVGA | 2009 | 13.5 × 10.3 in (343 × 262 mm) | 9 | |
| XL-ATX | Gigabyte | 2010 | 13.58 × 10.31 in (345 × 262 mm) | 7 | |
| XL-ATX | MSI | 2010 | 13.6 × 10.4 in (345 × 264 mm) | 7 | |
| WTX | Intel | 1998 | 14 × 16.75 in (356 × 425 mm). | 9 | Discontinued 2008 |
| Mini-ATX | Intel | 1995 or 1996 | 11.2 × 8.2in (284 × 208 mm). | 6 | Intended to fit 4 boards per panel, removed from ATX spec in v2.1 |
| Mini-ITX | VIA | 2001 | 6.7 × 6.7in (170 × 170 mm). | 1 | Originally designed for home theatre or other fanless applications |
| Mini-DTX | AMD | 2007 | 8 × 6.7 in (203 × 170 mm) | 2 | Derived from Mini-ITX and DTX |
| BTX | Intel | 2004 | 12.8 × 10.5 in (325 × 267 mm) | 7 | Canceled 2006. Also micro, nano, and pico variants. Not generally compatible with ATX mounting. |
| HPTX | EVGA | 2010 | 13.6 × 15 in (345 × 381 mm) | 6 | Dual processors, 12 RAM slots |
| SWTX | Supermicro | 2006 | 16.48 × 13 in (419 × 330 mm) and others | 5 | Quad processors, not compatible with ATX mounting |

=== Maximum number of expansion card slots ===
ATX case compatible:

| Specification | Number |
|---|---|
| HPTX | 9 |
| ATX/EATX/SSI EEB/SSI CEB | 7 |
| MicroATX | 4 |
| FlexATX | 3 |
| DTX/Mini-DTX | 2 |
| Mini-ITX | 1 |

== Visual examples of different form factors ==
Different form factors

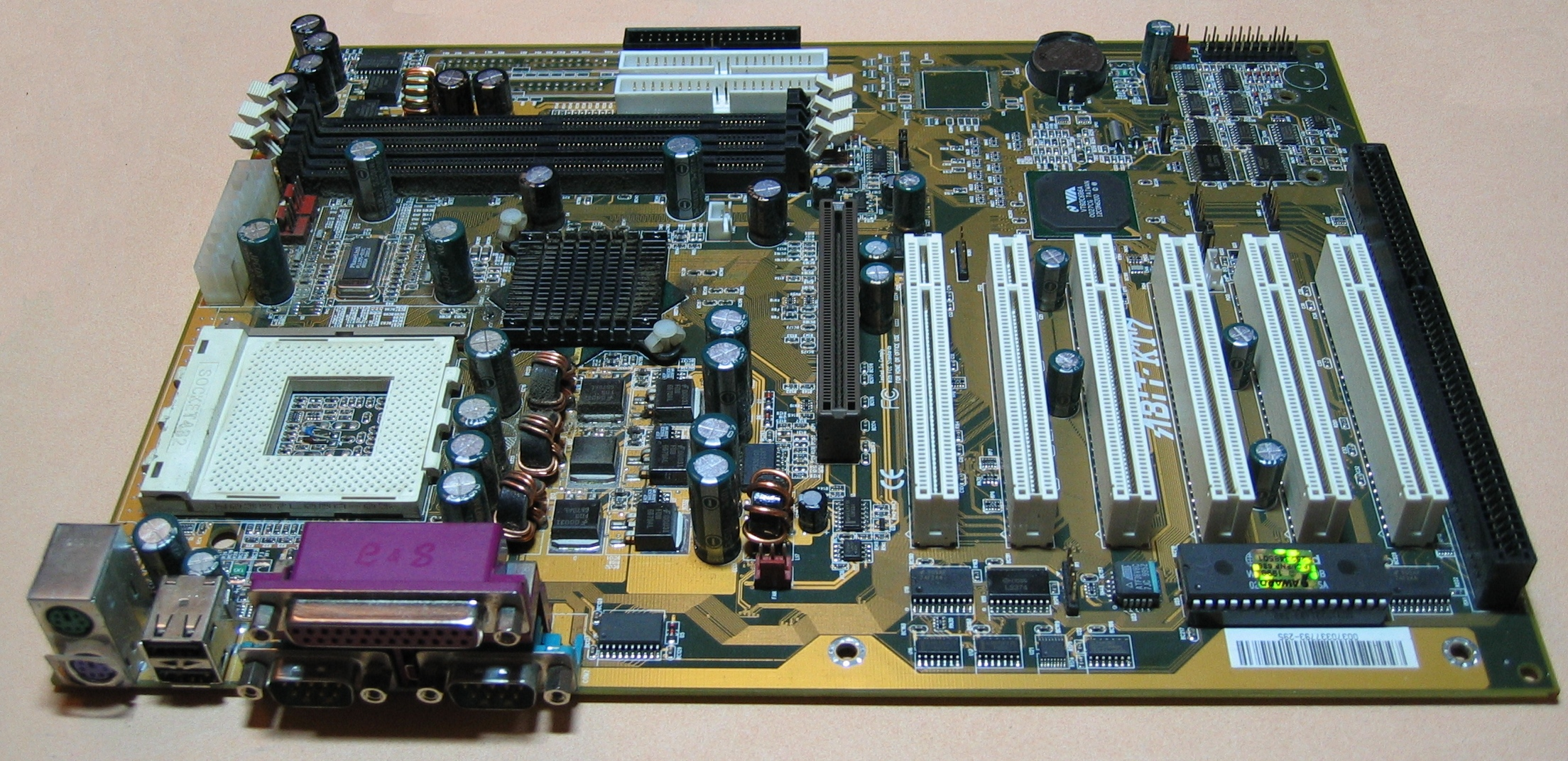
ATX
(Abit KT7)

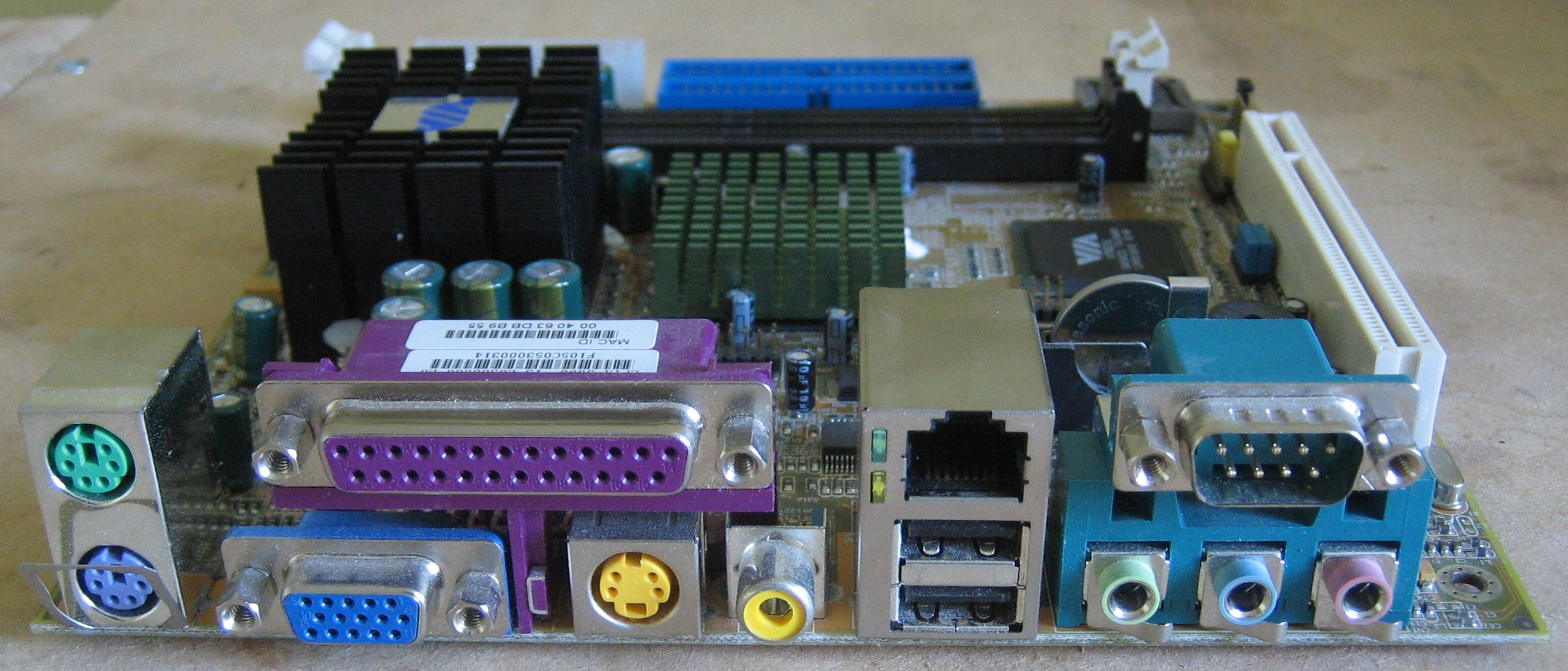
mini-ITX
(VIA EPIA 5000AG)

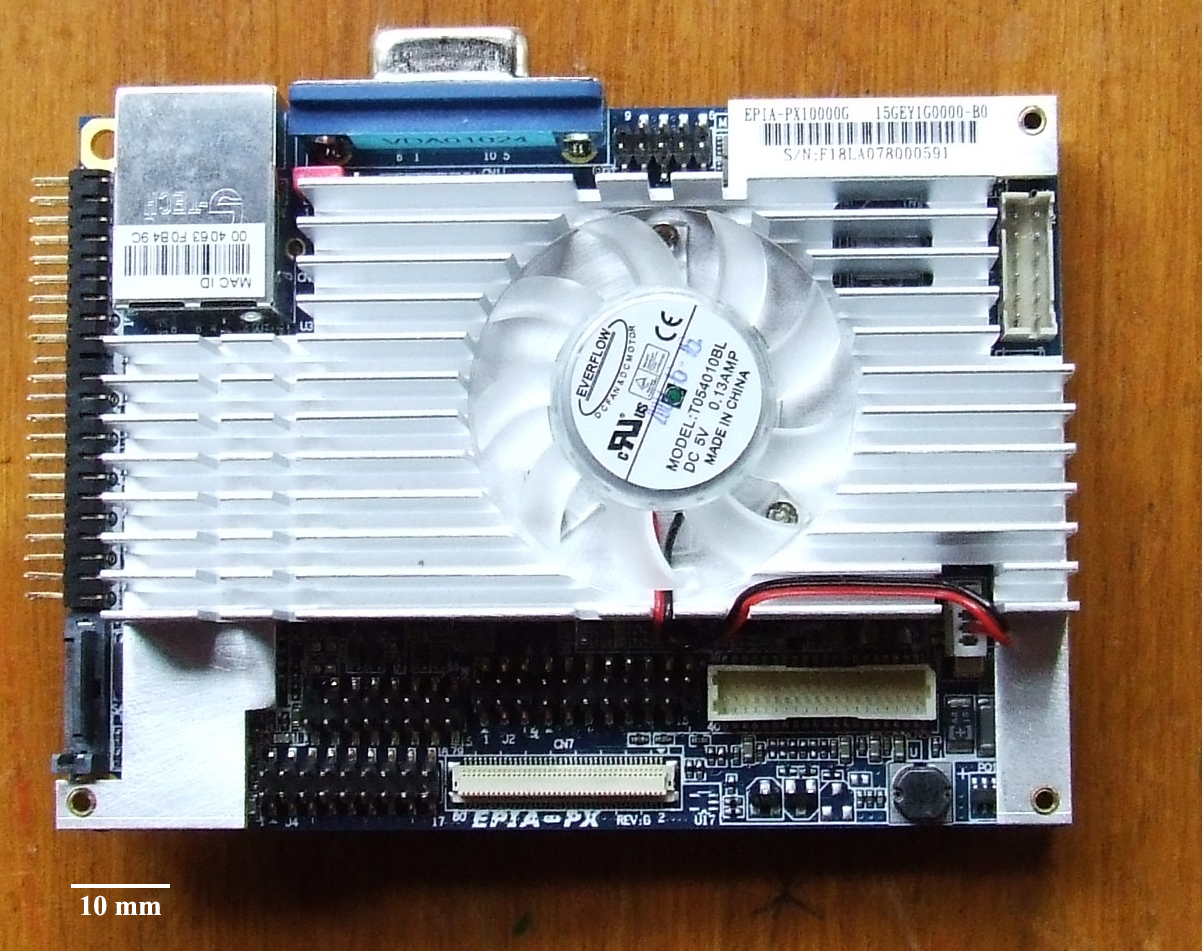
Pico-ITX
(VIA EPIA PX10000G)

== PC/104 and EBX ==
PC/104 is an embedded computer standard which defines both a form factor and computer bus. PC/104 is intended for embedded computing environments. Single-board computers built to this form factor are often sold by COTS vendors, which benefits users who want a customized rugged system, without months of design and paper work.

The PC/104 form factor was standardized by the PC/104 Consortium in 1992. An IEEE standard corresponding to PC/104 was drafted as IEEE P996.1, but never ratified.

The 5.75 × 8.0 in Embedded Board eXpandable (EBX) specification, which was derived from Ampro's proprietary Little Board form-factor, resulted from a collaboration between Ampro and Motorola Computer Group.

As compared with PC/104 modules, these larger (but still reasonably embeddable) SBCs tend to have everything of a full PC on them, including application oriented interfaces like audio, analog, or digital I/O in many cases. Also it's much easier to fit Pentium CPUs, whereas it's a tight squeeze (or expensive) to do so on a PC/104 SBC. Typically, EBX SBCs contain: the CPU; upgradeable RAM subassemblies (e.g., DIMM); Flash memory for solid state drive; multiple USB, serial, and parallel ports; onboard expansion via a PC/104 module stack; off-board expansion via ISA and/or PCI buses (from the PC/104 connectors); networking interface (typically Ethernet); and video (typically CRT, LCD, and TV).

== Mini PC ==
Mini PC is a PC small form factor very close in size to an external CD or DVD drive. Mini PCs have proven popular for use as HTPCs.

=== Examples ===
- AOpen XC mini
- Apple Mac mini (not considered a PC by Apple)
- Intel NUC
- Gigabyte Brix
- Zotac ZBOX
- Asus Vivopc
- Lenovo ThinkCentre Tiny
- Dell Optiplex Mini/Micro
- Acer Veriton
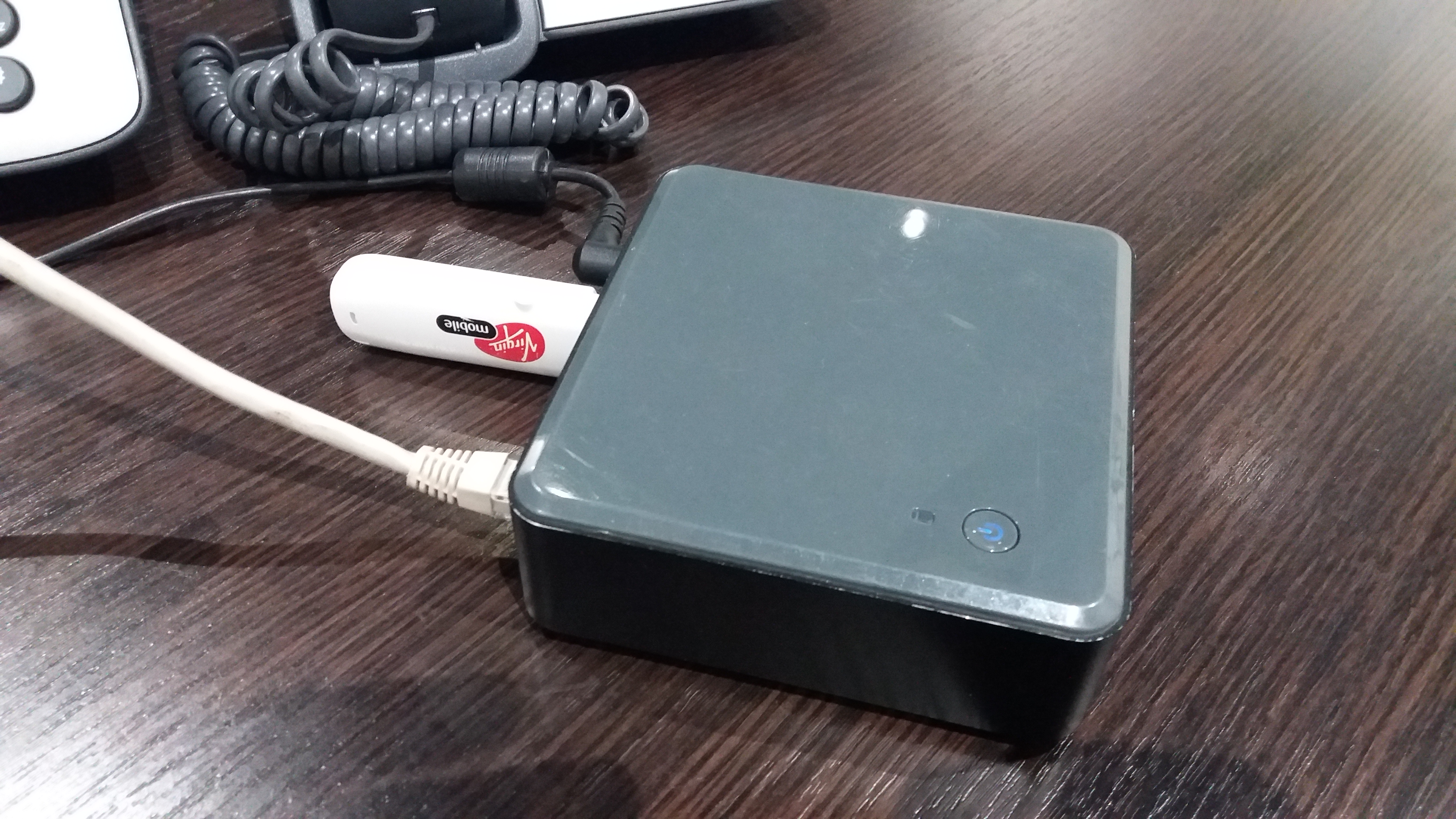
Intel NUC

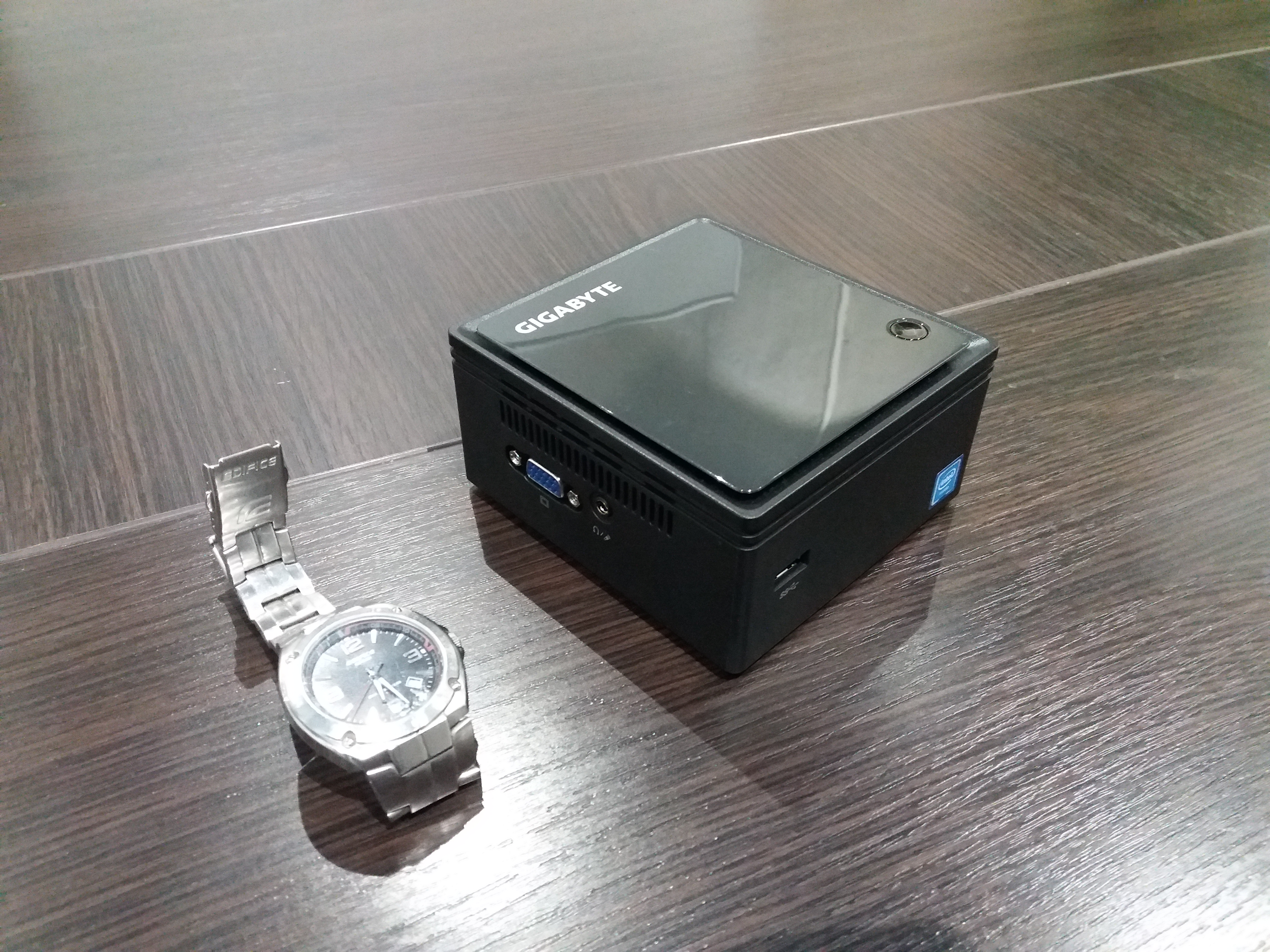
Gigabyte BRIX

== See also ==
- Hard-disk-drive form factors
- Small form factor
- PICOe
