= Package =

Package may refer to:

== Containers or enclosures ==
- Packaging and labeling, enclosing or protecting products
- Mail items larger than a letter
- Chip package or chip carrier
- Electronic packaging, in electrical engineering
- Automotive package, in automobile production and marketing
- Package holiday, in tourism

== Computing ==
- Modular programming, a programming paradigm
- Java package, a mechanism for organizing Java classes
- Package manager, a computer program to install and manage applications or libraries
- Package (macOS), a directory hierarchy normally treated as a single object in the Finder in macOS
- Package (UML) in the context of UML, which is used to group elements
- Package format, a type of archive containing computer programs and related metadata

== Entertainment and sports ==
- Movie packaging, in which a talent agency bundles its clients with a film or TV project
- Formation (American football), sometimes referred to as "packages" rather than "formations"
- Personnel grouping (gridiron football), often called a "(personnel) package", a numeric code denoting the specific offensive skill position players used for a play

== See also ==
- Pack (disambiguation)
- Package film (disambiguation)
- Packager (disambiguation)
- Packaging (disambiguation)
- Packet (disambiguation)
- PKG (disambiguation)
- Software package (disambiguation)
- Surprise Package (disambiguation)
- The Package (disambiguation)
