= Motherboard (disambiguation) =

A motherboard is the main printed circuit board in a computer.

Motherboard may also refer to:

- Motherboard cache, the storage component of a motherboard
- Motherboard form factor, the specifications of a motherboard
- Motherboard (Cyberchase), a character from Cyberchase
- Motherboard (website), an online tech news publication by Vice Media
- "Motherboard" (Daft Punk song), a 2013 song in album Random Access Memories
- Motherboard (film), a 2024 documentary
