= STX =

STX may refer to:

== Businesses ==
- Seagate Technology, a hard drive manufacturer with stock symbol STX
- STX (sports manufacturer), a sports manufacturer based in Baltimore, Maryland
- STX Corporation (System Technology Excellence), a Korea-based holding company
- STX Entertainment, a Los Angeles-based motion picture production and distribution company
- STX Europe, a ship builder

== Chemistry ==
- Saxitoxin, a neurotoxin found in marine dinoflagellates
- Shiga toxin
- Syntaxin, a membrane integrated Q-SNARE protein participating in exocytosis

== Computing ==
- A secure private telephone network used by London Stock Exchange affiliated firms and professionals
- PASTI raw disk image format for the Atari ST
- Start of Text, a control code in the C0 control code set
- Socket Technology EXtended, the Mini-STX computer form factor
- Streaming Transformations for XML, an XML transformation language
- Structured text, a plaintext markup language

== Places ==
- Henry E. Rohlsen Airport (IATA code: STX), an airport on St. Croix, U.S. Virgin Islands
- South Texas
- St Croix, U.S. Virgin Islands
- St Cross College, Oxford

== Other uses ==
- Case STX Steiger, a tractorline built by Case IH
- Star Trek: Nemesis, the 10th film in the Star Trek film franchise (Star Trek X)
- Almen studentereksamen, an examination used in Denmark for the secondary school called gymnasium
