= DTX (form factor) =

Physical standard for computer motherboards

Comparison of the form factors for motherboards ATX, μATX (micro-ATX), DTX, mini-ITX and mini-DTX

The DTX form factor is a variation of the ATX specification designed especially for small form factor PCs (especially for HTPCs) with dimensions of 8 × 9.6 inches (203 × 244 mm). An industry standard intended to enable interchangeability for systems similar to Shuttle's original "SFF" designs, AMD announced its development on January 10, 2007. AMD stated that the DTX form factor is an open standard, and is backward compatible with ATX form factor cases. It also present a shorter variant named Mini-DTX which is smaller in PCB size of 8 × 6.7 inches (203 × 170 mm).

The specification provides for up to two expansion slots on a DTX motherboard, in the same position as the top two slots on an ATX or microATX board. The spec also provides for optional ExpressCard expansion slots on DTX motherboards.

== Comparison ==
DTX is a shorter version of ATX and micro-ATX, and Mini-DTX is a slightly longer version of Mini-ITX. Mini-ITX can have only one expansion slot, whereas Mini-DTX has the same width and can have two expansion slots.

Specification	Year	Dimensions of motherboard	Expansion slots
ATX	1995	12 × 9.6 in (305 × 244 mm)	7
microATX	1997	9.6 × 9.6 in (244 × 244 mm)	4
DTX	2007	8 × 9.6 in (203 × 244 mm)	2
mini-DTX	2007	8 × 6.7 in (203 × 170 mm)	2
mini-ITX	2001	6.7 × 6.7 in (170 × 170 mm)	1

== Benefits ==
There are several benefits DTX provides to reduce production costs:

- A standard PCB manufacturing panel can yield four DTX motherboards, or six Mini-DTX motherboards.
- DTX motherboards can be manufactured in as few as four layers of printed circuit board wiring for motherboard cost savings.
- Backward compatibility with ATX helps to minimize DTX development costs.

== See also ==
- BTX
