= EPIC (form factor) =

Computer form factor for a single board computer

Embedded Platform for Industrial Computing (EPIC) is a computer form factor, a standard for an industrial-quality single-board computer, in use from about 2004 through 2016.

== History ==
The EPIC standard was developed by a combined effort from WinSystems, VersaLogic, Octagon Systems, Micro/sys, and Ampro. Single board computers using this standard were available as early as 2004. The EPIC-SBC group had a web site until about 2016.

EPIC modules are 6.5 × 4.5 inches (165 × 114 mm) in size, between PC/104-Plus and Embedded Board eXpandable (EBX) standards. It supported both PC/104 and PC/104-Plus expansion, for which hundreds of I/O modules were available. I/O connections can be either pin headers or PC-style connectors. The standard provides specific I/O zones to implement functions such as Ethernet, serial ports, digital and analog I/O, video, wireless, and various application-specific interfaces. It also supported serial buses like PCI Express.
