= BTX =

BTX may refer to:

- Bildschirmtext, an interactive videotex system launched in 1983 in West Germany
- BTX (chemistry), a mixture of benzene, toluene and xylenes
- B't X, a science fiction manga and anime television series created by Masami Kurumada
- BTX (form factor), a form factor for PC motherboards
- Backstreets Magazine, also known as BTX, a popular Internet forum for fans of musician Bruce Springsteen
- Batrachotoxin, a neurotoxic poison that blocks sodium channels
- Botulinum toxin, the most potent neurotoxin known
