= Packaging (disambiguation) =

Packaging is the science, art and technology of enclosing or protecting products for distribution, storage, sale, and use.

Packaging may also refer to:

== Specialised packaging ==
- Active packaging, packaging systems to help extend shelf life, monitor freshness, display information on quality, improve safety, and improve convenience**Self-heating food packaging, active packaging with the ability to heat food contents without external heat sources or power
- Blister packaging, pre-formed plastic packaging used for small goods
- Child-resistant packaging, packaging used to reduce the risk of children ingesting hazardous materials
- Cosmetic packaging, cosmetic containers and secondary packaging of cosmetic products
- Currency packaging, forms of packing money for easy handling and counting
- Electronic packaging, enclosures and protective features in electronic devices
  - Dual in-line package, an electronic component package
  - Integrated circuit packaging, final stage in construction of an integrated circuit
    - Quilt packaging, an integrated circuit packaging
    - Wafer-level packaging, packaging an integrated circuit while still part of the wafer
- Food packaging, packaging for food
  - Disposable food packaging, comprises disposable items often found in food service
- Luxury packaging, the design, research, development, and manufacturing of packaging, displays, and for luxury brands
- Modified atmosphere packaging
- Optical disc packaging, the packaging that accompanies CDs, DVDs, and other formats of optical discs
  - Spindle (disc packaging), plastic container for packaging optical discs
- Pharmaceutical packaging, packages and the packaging processes for pharmaceutical preparations
  - Unit dose packaging
- Plain tobacco packaging, particular packaging of tobacco products
- Resealable packaging, packaging that allows the consumer or user to reseal or reclose the packaging
- Reusable packaging, packaging from durable materials and is specifically designed for multiple trips
- Shelf-ready packaging, packaging that supports the store staff in terms of the selection of the right products
- Sustainable packaging, an environmental considerations for packaging
- Tube (container), a collapsible package which can be used for viscous liquids
- Vacuum packaging, packaging that removes air from the package prior to sealing
- Video game packaging, physical storage of the contents of a PC or console game

== Biology ==
- Coronavirus packaging signal, in molecular biology
- DNA packaging
- Retroviral Psi packaging element, in molecular biology

== Design and sales ==
- Dynamic packaging, in package holiday bookings
- Form factor (design), the size, shape, and other physical specifications of components
- Packaging engineering, topic ranging from design conceptualization to product placement
- Seasonal packaging, marketing a product by wrapping the product in a package closely related to seasons or holidays

== Media ==
- Book packaging, publishing activity
- Movie packaging, in the film industry
- Packaging Digest, business magazine
- Packaging World, business magazine

== Technology ==
- Software package (disambiguation)
- XML-binary Optimized Packaging, in XML software

== Other uses ==
- Information packaging
- Salary packaging, Australian term for manipulation of employee benefits

== See also ==
- Package (disambiguation)
- Packing (disambiguation)
