= PC/104 Consortium =

The PC/104 Consortium is a technology consortium that was established in February 1992 by 12 companies, all sharing a vision of adapting desktop computer technology for embedded applications. Based on the technologies of a IBM PC-based single-board computer developed by American company Ampro in 1987, the PC/104 Consortium has since had a positive effect on the embedded computer marketplace and now includes over 50 member companies. The PC/104 Consortium's technological philosophy is to support legacy technology while developing new solutions for the future. Longevity is a requirement for embedded systems and one of the hallmarks of PC/104 technology.

== Adopted specifications ==
- PC/104 – based on Industry Standard Architecture (ISA)
- PC/104-Plus – based on Peripheral Component Interconnect (PCI) and ISA
- PCI-104 – based on PCI
- PCI/104-Express – based on PCI Express (PCIe) and PCI
- PCIe/104 – based on PCIe
- EBX Express – based on PCIe and PCI
- EPIC – based on PCI and ISA
- EPIC Express – based on PCIe and PCI
