= The Package =

The Package may refer to:

== Film and television ==
- The Package (1989 film), an American political action thriller film
- The Package (2013 film), an American action film
- The Package (2018 film), an American teen comedy film
- The Package (TV series), a 2017 South Korean drama series
- "The Package" (Lost), a 2010 TV episode
- "The Package" (Seinfeld), a 1996 TV episode

== Other uses ==
- "The Package" (short story), a 1952 short story by Kurt Vonnegut
- "The Package", a 2003 song by A Perfect Circle from Thirteenth Step
- The Package Tour, a 2013 concert tour by New Kids on the Block, 98 Degrees, and Boyz II Men
- Jake Stringer (born 1994), nicknamed "The Package", Australian rules footballer

== See also ==
- El Paquete Semanal ("The Weekly Package"), or El Paquet, a Cuban collection of pirated media circulated in lieu of broadband Internet
- Package (disambiguation)
