= PKG =

PKG or Pkg may refer to

- .pkg file extension
- Package (disambiguation)
- Pangkor Airport, which is assigned the IATA code USM
- Penkridge railway station, Staffordshire, National Rail station code PKG
- pkg, Image Packaging System used to install the Solaris Operating systems and its applications
- The pkg(8) command-line utility for installing and managing FreeBSD packages
- Protein kinase G
