= Software package =

Software package may refer to:

- Package manager, which packages individual software (as files, or other resources) together, as a collection to provide various functions as part of a larger system
- Software suite, which provides an organized collection of multiple packages, or a package consisting of multiple separate pieces
- Modular programming, where libraries and pieces of code are packaged as modular pieces, sometimes called "packages" (for example Java package)

== See also ==
- Package (disambiguation)
- Packager (disambiguation)
- Packaging (disambiguation)
