= BTX (form factor) =

Form factor for motherboards

Comparison BTX μBTX nanoBTX ITX picoBTX

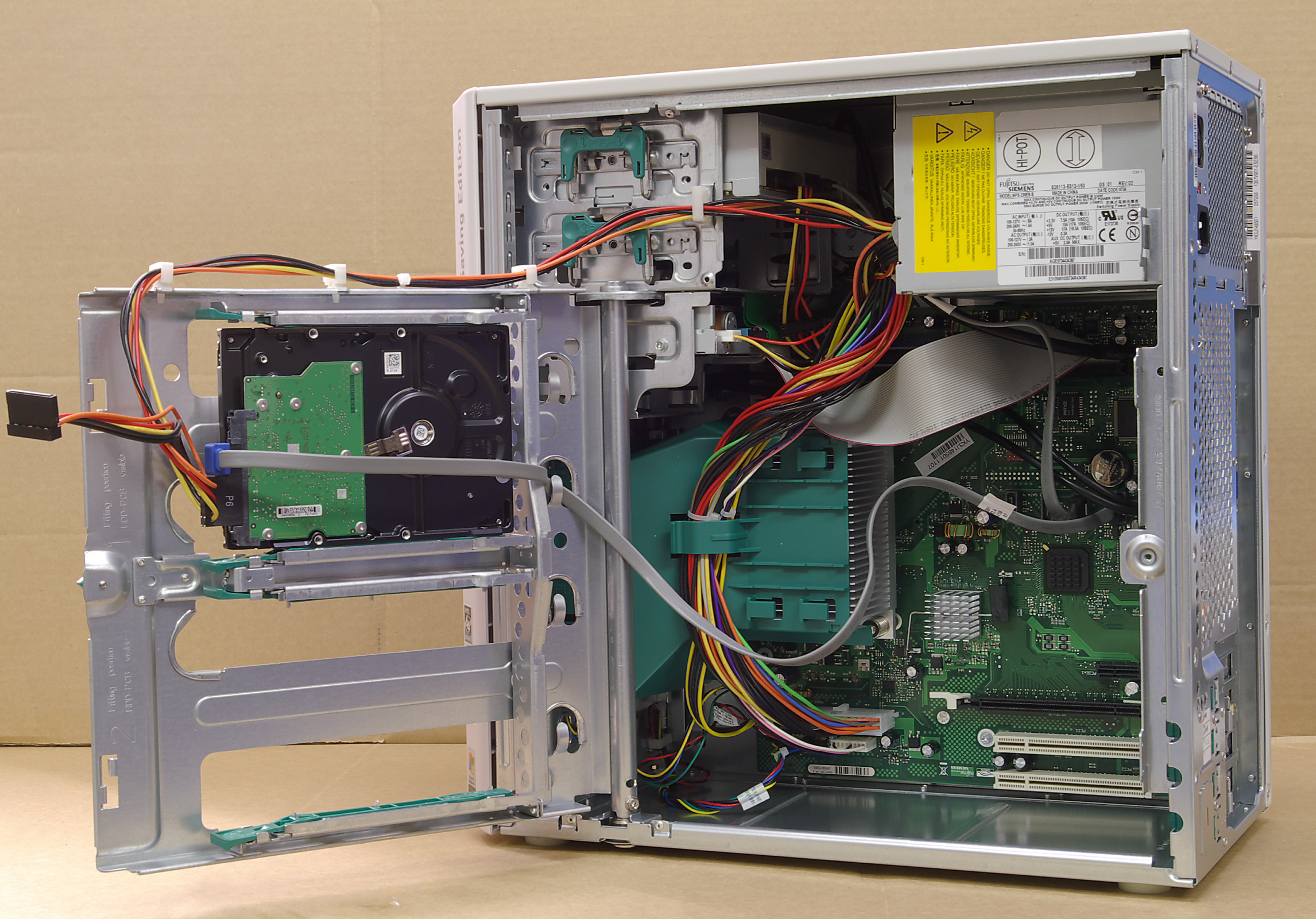
BTX case of a Fujitsu Siemens Esprimo P2510

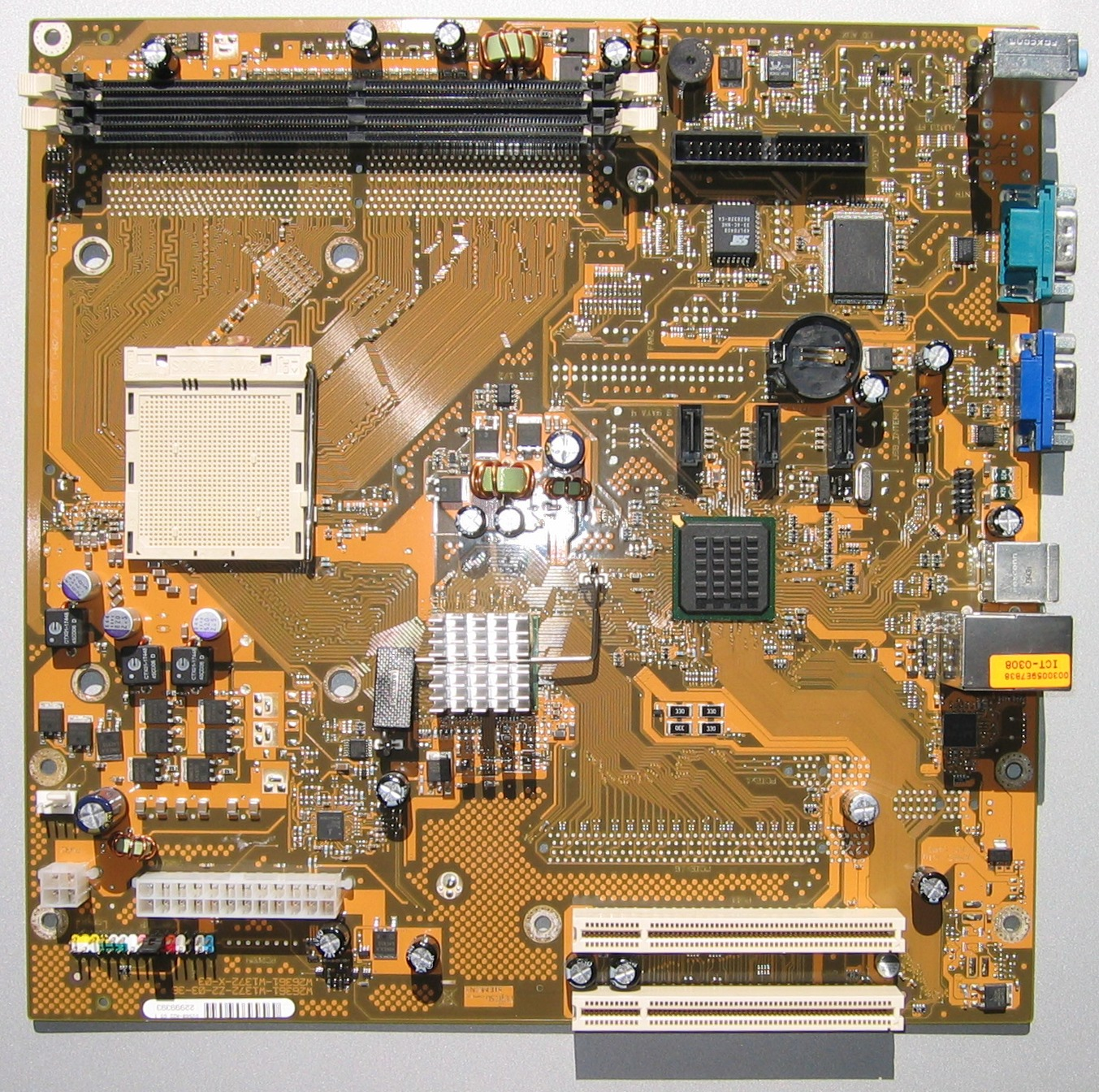
Clearly visible: the four holes for the "Support and Retention Module (SRM)"

BTX (for Balanced Technology eXtended) is a form factor for motherboards, originally intended to be the replacement for the aging ATX motherboard form factor.

It was designed in late 2004 and early 2005 to alleviate issues that arose from using the newer technologies of the time (which demanded more power and created more heat) on motherboards compliant with the ATX specification that dated from 1995. The ATX and BTX standards were both proposed by Intel. However, future development of BTX retail products by Intel was canceled in September 2006 following Intel's decision to refocus on low-power CPUs after suffering scaling and thermal issues with the Pentium 4.

The first company to implement BTX was Gateway Inc, followed by Dell and MPC. The first generation of Apple's Mac Pro used some elements of the BTX design system as well, but was not BTX-compliant, instead using a proprietary form factor.

== Enhancements ==
- Low-profile – With the push for ever-smaller systems, a redesigned backplane that shaves inches off height requirements is a benefit to system integrators and enterprises who use rack mounts or blade servers.
- Thermal design – The BTX layout establishes a straighter path of airflow with fewer obstacles, resulting in better overall cooling capabilities. There is no dedicated CPU fan – instead, a large 12 cm case fan is mounted, drawing its air directly from outside the computer and cooling the CPU through an airduct. Another distinct feature of BTX is the vertical mounting of the motherboard on the left-hand side. This results in the graphics card heatsink or fan facing upwards, rather than in the direction of the adjacent expansion card.
- Structural design – The BTX standard specifies different locations for hardware mounting points, thereby reducing latency between key components and also reduces the physical strain imposed on the motherboard by heat sinks, capacitors and other components dealing with electrical and thermal regulation. For example, the Northbridge and Southbridge chips are located near each other and to the hardware they control like CPU, RAM and expansion ports (PS/2, USB, LPT etc.)

=== picoBTX ===
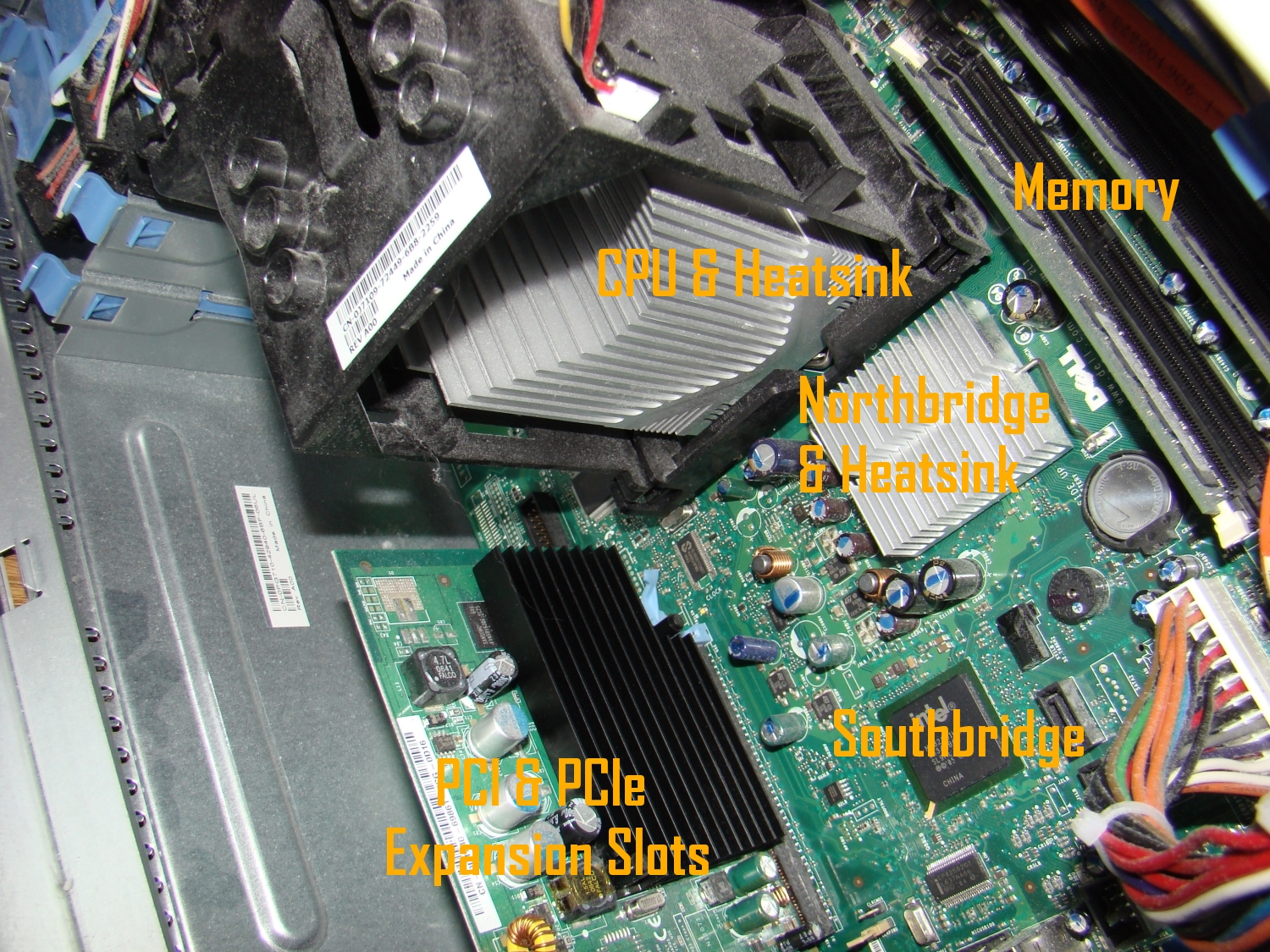
BTX form factor motherboard inside a Dell Dimension E520

Pico BTX is a motherboard form factor that is meant to miniaturize the 12.8 × 10.5 in (325 × 267 mm) BTX standard. Pico BTX motherboards measure 8 × 10.5 in (203 × 267 mm). This is smaller than many current "micro"-sized motherboards, hence the name "pico". These motherboards share a common top half with the other sizes in the BTX line, but support only one or two expansion slots, designed for half-height or riser card applications.

Other smaller BTX sizes include: microBTX at 10.4 × 10.5 in (264 × 267 mm) and nano BTX at 8.8 × 10.5 in (224 × 267 mm).

| Specification | Year | Dimensions of motherboard | Expansion slots |
|---|---|---|---|
| BTX | 2004 | 10.5 × 12.8 in (266.70 × 325.12 mm) | 7 |
| microBTX | 2004 | 10.5 × 10.4 in (266.70 × 264.16 mm) | 4 |
| nanoBTX | 2004 | 10.5 × 8.8 in (266.70 × 223.52 mm) | 2 |
| picoBTX | 2004 | 10.5 × 8.0 in (266.70 × 203.20 mm) | 1 |

The heat sink to be attached to the CPU, called "Thermal Module" throughout the official specification, is no longer attached solely to the motherboard, but to the casing itself, so that the inertial load of its mass during a mechanical shock event can no longer damage the motherboard.

The structural interface between the heat sink and the chassis, is defined as 4 mounting holes with the distances of 4.4 × 2.275 in (55.79 × 111.76 mm) between one another. And since this attachment means is also required to have a certain stiffness, it is called "Support and Retention Module (SRM)" in the specification.

== Reception ==
Despite its improvements over ATX and related standards, the BTX form factor was not widely adopted.

One reason for the failure of BTX to gain traction in key markets was the rise of energy-efficient components (CPUs, chipsets and GPUs) which require less power and produce less waste heat, eliminating two of the primary intended benefits of BTX. Another reason was the lack of OEM adopters.

Initially, only Gateway and Dell offered computers with the new format, later HP and Fujitsu-Siemens (now Fujitsu) also offered some BTX-based computers. Most other manufacturers stayed with the ATX standard, and even the handful of manufacturers who did adopt BTX for some products continued to produce the bulk of their machines with the ATX form factor.
