= Ampro =

Defunct computer systems manufacturer

Ampro Computers, Inc.
- Company type: Private
- Industry: Computer
- Founded: 1983; 42 years ago in Mountain View, California, United States
- Founders: Rick Lehrbaum; David Feldman
- Defunct: April 2008; 17 years ago
- Fate: Acquried by ADLINK
- Products: Single-board computers; Embedded systems
- Website: ampro.com (archived)

Ampro Computers, Inc., simply known as Ampro, was an American computer systems manufacturer active from 1983 to 2008 and based in Silicon Valley in California. It was one of the first manufacturers of embedded systems based on the IBM Personal Computer architecture and was the progenitor of the PC/104 embedded system form factor. In 2008, it was acquired by ADLINK of Taiwan.

== History ==
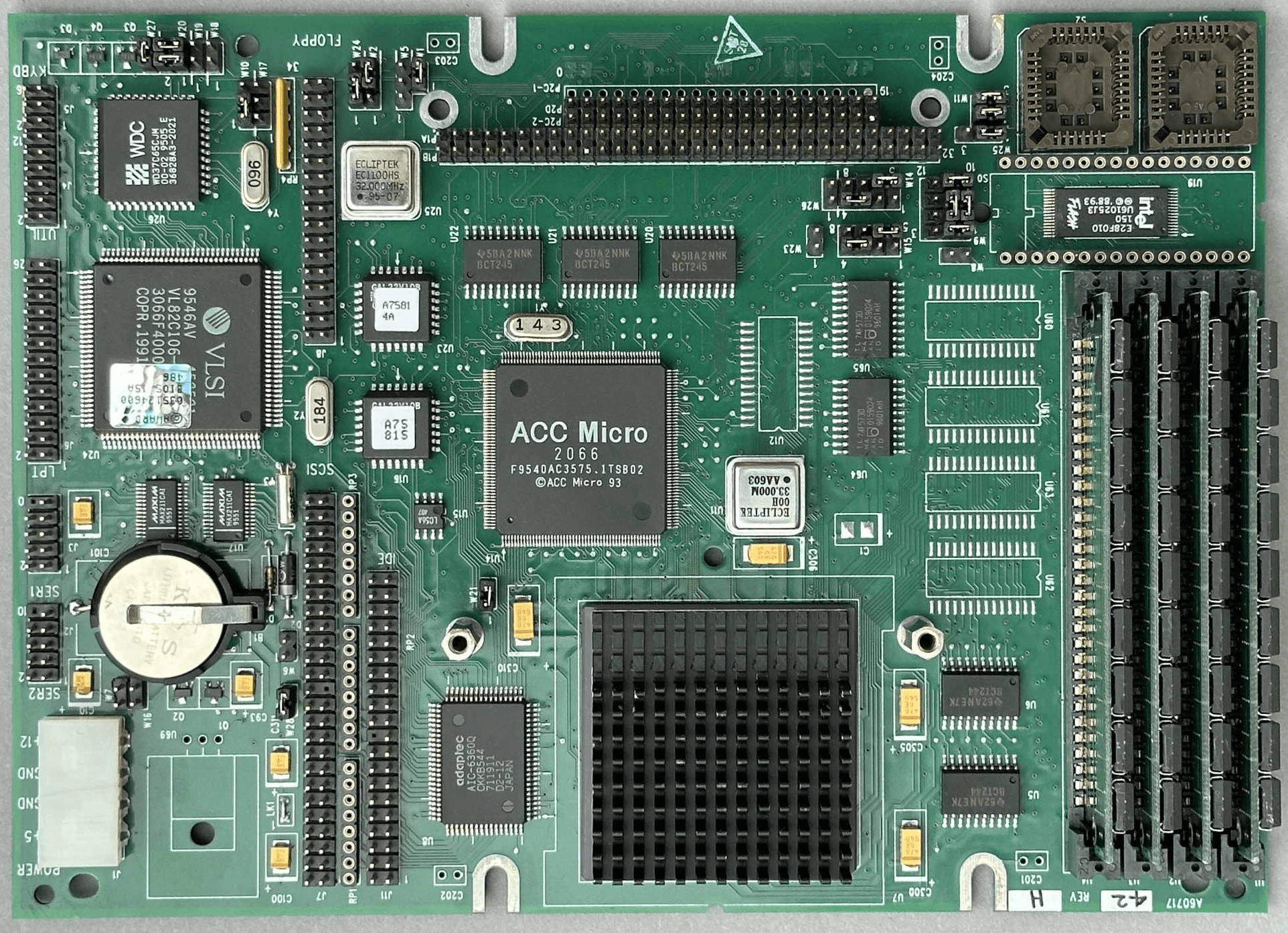
Ampro Little Board/486, i486-equipped board from 1995 (featuring an ACC Micro chipset, at center)

Ampro was founded in Mountain View, California, in 1983 by Rick Lehrbaum and David Feldman. Both had been working for Telesensory Systems, a manufacturer of assistive technology for the blind and visually impaired, when Feldman got a call from someone unloading used microcomputer systems for less than $1000 each. Feeling that sub-$1000 microcomputers was an untapped market, the two founded Ampro with their own capital. Lehrbaum was named the vice president of engineering while Feldman was the president and chairman; the former designed most of the company's hardware while the latter handled sales and finances. Ampro's first product, the Little Board, was a small single-board computer (SBC) featured a Zilog Z80A microprocessor and had all the necessary supporting chips to have it run CP/M on ROM, with customers only needing to provide their own power supply, floppy disk drives, and terminal. The company later incorporated it into a cube-shaped chassis, 6.5 by 7 by 10.5 inches (17 by 18 by 27 cm) in dimension, as the Ampro Bookshelf Series 100, complete with dual 5.25-inch floppy disk drives. The original Little Board was first advertised in the back pages of Byte magazine and "took off like a rocket", according to Lehrbaum.

As the Apple II and IBM Personal Computer quickly subsumed sales of other microcomputer systems in the mid-1980s, Ampro realized they could not compete in the self-contained personal computer market and pivoted to designing single-board computers for embedded systems. In October 1985, Ampro introduced the Little Board/186, a SBC featuring the Intel 80186 that was roughly compatible with IBM PC software, with the caveat that it did not support any application that wrote to video memory—output was strictly ASCII via a remote terminal. It also contained a SCSI host adapter on-board, allowing it to interface with networks over the SCSI bus. The company later introduced Little Boards based on the Intel 80286 and Intel 80386, bringing with it compatibility with software for the IBM PC AT and PC compatibles based on the 386. Ampro also introduced a system of mezzanine boards, dubbed MiniModule, that could connect to the main SBC, adding capabilities such as graphical output and modem communication, bringing them to full feature parity with full-sized IBM PC compatibles. In January 1989, Ampro introduced the Embedded UNIX Platform, which was the first embedded system with Unix on ROM, aimed at the telecommunication and computer networking industry as well as government organizations, which relied heavily on Unix. Based on the company's PC AT–compatible Little Board 286, it came with either Unix System V or XENIX on ROM.

In October 1990, Ampro introduced an even smaller series of SBCs called the CoreModule. It came in variants based on the PC XT and the PC AT and measured 3.6 by 3.8 inches (91 by 97 mm) while incorporating the CoreModule system of expansion. Both the PC-based Little Boards and CoreModules proved wildly successful, with sales increasing from $1.6 million in 1986 to over $14 million in 1990. The form factor of the CoreModule and its MiniModule expansion system was codified in late 1991 as PC/104. The name PC/104 derives from both its IBM PC compatibility and the 104 pins of the original mezzanine expansion slot. Ampro were joined by eleven other manufacturers in the foundation of PC/104 Consortium, a technology consortium centered on the standardization and development of PC/104. By 2003, PC/104 Consortium comprised over 150 members.

Ampro's sales declined suddenly in 1991, with Feldman ascribing this to the United States' involvement Gulf War and the subsequent drop in business deals among European countries. By Feldman's estimate, sales dropped 10 percent. Layoffs ensued, with the company's employee base shrinking from 65 to 36 in 1992. Feldman gave employees three months notice and ten days of severance despite the company having almost no cash reserves. Said Feldman: "If the company was going to survive, our reputation would be in the hands of the people we laid off". Despite these efforts, the layoffs spawned a number of wrongful termination lawsuits, including one by Ampro's former chief financial officer. Feldman left Ampro in 1995, founding a new start-up company in the system-on-a-chip industry, ZF Micro Devices, with John Lio in Grass Valley, California, immediately after. Feldman was replaced as president of Ampro by Lehrbaum.

In 2008, Ampro was acquired by ADLINK Technology Inc. of Taiwan.

== See also ==
- Embedded Platform for Industrial Computing (EPIC), an SBC form factor co-developed by Ampro
- XTX, a computer-on-module standard co-developed by Ampro
