= Packager =

Packager may refer to:

- Packager (manufacturing), encloses products for distribution, storage, sale, and use
- Book packager, handles roles of book agent, editor, and publisher
- Comics packager, handles roles of comic book agent, editor, and publisher

== See also ==
- Package (disambiguation)
- Pack (disambiguation)
- Software package (disambiguation)
