= Packet =

Packet may refer to:

- A small container or pouch
  - Packet (container), a small single use container
  - Cigarette packet
  - Sugar packet
- Network packet, a formatted unit of data carried by a packet-mode computer network
- Packet radio, a form of amateur radio data communications using the AX25 protocol
- Packet trade, regularly scheduled cargo, passenger, and mail trade conducted by ship
- Packet boat, type of boat used for scheduled mail or passenger service
- C-82 Packet, a U.S. military transport aircraft
- Packet Newspapers, British newspaper group

== See also ==
- Package (disambiguation)
- Pack (disambiguation)
- Kit (disambiguation)
- MacGuffin - A plot device in the form of some goal, desired object, or another motivator popularized in the 1930s by Alfred Hitchcock: "Taken from a story about two men on a train. One man says, 'What's that package up there in the baggage rack?' And the other answers, 'Oh, that's a MacGuffin'. The first one asks, 'What's a MacGuffin?'"
