= Package film =

Package film may refer to:

- Anthology film, a film consisting of several different shorter films
- Overwrap, a method of sealing a contained product
- Plastic film, a thin continuous polymeric material
- Plastic wrap, a thin plastic film
- Shrink wrap, a material made up of polymer plastic film
- Stretch wrap, a highly stretchable plastic film
