= Motherboard (film) =

2025 British documentary film

- Directed by: Victoria Mapplebeck
- Written by: Victoria Mapplebeck
- Produced by: Debbie Manners, Victoria Mapplebeck
- Starring: Victoria Mapplebeck, Jim Mapplebeck
- Cinematography: Victoria Mapplebeck
- Edited by: Oli Bauer, Victoria Mapplebeck
- Music by: Jamie Perera
- Production company: First Person Films
- Distributed by: Autlook Film Sales, Tull Stories
- Release dates: March 2024 (CPH;Dox); 15 August 2025 (UK)
- Running time: 87 minutes
- Country: United Kingdom
- Language: English

Motherboard is a 2024 feature-length documentary film directed by Victoria Mapplebeck. The film chronicles Mapplebeck’s experiences of solo motherhood and her relationship with her son Jim, over a period of approximately twenty years.

Mapplebeck began filming after becoming a single mother at the age of 38, initially using a DVCAM before transitioning to successive generations of smartphone cameras to document two decades of raising her son alone. The documentary also engages with themes of technology in contemporary storytelling, using mobile devices as a primary medium for cinematic expression.

The film combines filmed conversations with Mapplebeck and her son, video diaries, text messages and voice notes to chart their family life over two decades. Events depicted include Mapplebeck’s breast cancer diagnosis and the absence of Jim’s father from much of his upbringing It offers an intimate exploration of motherhood, childhood, family dynamics, and personal resilience.

== Release ==
Motherboard had its world premiere in competition at CPH:DOX in March 2024 and its UK premiere at the BFI London Film Festival in October 2024 . It was subsequently screened at several international film festivals.

Autlook Film Sales acquired the rights for worldwide sales and Motherboard is distributed by Tull Stories, receiving a theatrical release in the UK and Ireland on 15 August 2025.

== Critical reception ==
The New World compared it to other longitudinal documentary projects for its portrayal of life over time. British Film Institute praised it for its candid and unfiltered portrayal of family life The Guardian included it in their list of "the 50 best films of 2025".

=== Awards and nominations ===
Award	Date	Category	Result
Women in Film and TV Award	2025	Best Director	Won
IDA Documentary Awards	2024	Best Feature Documentary	Shortlisted
Grierson Awards	2025	Best Cinema Documentary	Nominated
BIFA Awards	2025	Best Documentary	Nominated
BIFA Awards	2025	Outstanding Debut Director	Nominated
BIFA Awards	2025	Raindance Maverick Award	Nominated
