= MicroBTX =

Motherboard form factor

microBTX (also called uBTX) is a computer motherboard form factor. A microBTX is 10.4 × 10.5 in (264 × 267 mm) and can support up to four expansion slots.

== See also ==
- Comparison of computer form factors
