= Mini-STX =

Computer motherboard form factor

Mini-STX (mSTX, Mini Socket Technology EXtended, originally "Intel 5x5") is a computer motherboard form factor that was released by Intel in 2015 (as "Intel 5x5").

These motherboards measure 147mm by 140mm (5.8" x 5.5"), making them larger than "4x4" NUC (102x102mm / 4.01" x 4.01" inches) and Nano-ITX (120x120mm / 4.7" x 4.7") boards, but notably smaller than the more common Mini-ITX (170x170mm / 6.7" x 6.7") boards. Unlike these standards, which use a square shape, the Mini-STX form factor is 7mm longer from front-to-rear, making it slightly rectangular.

== Mini-STX design elements ==
The Mini-STX design suggests (but does not require) support for:

- Socketed processors (e.g. LGA or PGA CPUs)
- Onboard power regulation circuitry, enabling direct DC power input
- IO ports embedded on the front and rear of the motherboard (akin to NUC, but unlike typical motherboards which often use headers instead to connect built-in ports on enclosures)

== Adoption by manufacturers ==
This motherboard form factor is still not in particularly common use with consumer-PC manufacturers, although there are a few offerings:

- ASRock offers both DeskMini kits (that use mini-STX boards) and standalone motherboards,
- Asus offer VivoMini kits (that use mini-STX boards) and standalone motherboards,
- Gigabyte offers a few motherboards, and
- industrial PC suppliers (e.g. Kontron, Iesy, ASRock Industrial) also provide some options for mini-STX equipment.

== Derivatives ==
ASRock developed a derivative of mini-STX, dubbed micro-STX, for their 'DeskMini GTX/RX' small form-factor PCs and industrial motherboards.

Micro-STX adds an MXM slot which allows the use of special PCI Express expansion cards, including graphics or machine learning accelerators, but increases the width of the board to be extended two inches, resulting in measurements of 147 x 188 mm (5.8" x 7.4")
