= Surprise Package =

Surprise Package may refer to:

- Surprise Package (film), a 1960 American comedy film
- Surprise package (band), an American rock band
- Surprise Package (gunship), the second iteration of the Lockheed AC-130 gunship program

== See also ==
- Pochette Surprise (Surprise Package), the debut album by French singer Jordy
