= Electronic packaging =

Enclosure for an electronic device

Electronic packaging is the design and production of enclosures for electronic devices ranging from individual semiconductor devices up to complete systems such as a mainframe computer. Packaging of an electronic system must consider protection from mechanical damage, cooling, radio frequency noise emission and electrostatic discharge. Product safety standards may dictate particular features of a consumer product, for example, external case temperature or grounding of exposed metal parts. Prototypes and industrial equipment made in small quantities may use standardized commercially available enclosures such as card cages or prefabricated boxes. Mass-market consumer devices may have highly specialized packaging to increase consumer appeal. Electronic packaging is a major discipline within the field of mechanical engineering.

== Design ==
Electronic packaging can be organized by levels:

- Level 0 - "Chip", protecting a bare semiconductor die from contamination and damage.
- Level 1 - Component, such as semiconductor package design and the packaging of other discrete components.
- Level 2 - Etched wiring board (printed circuit board).
- Level 3 - Assembly, one or more wiring boards and associated components.
- Level 4 - Module, assemblies integrated in an overall enclosure.
- Level 5 - System, a set of modules combined for some purpose.

The same electronic system may be packaged as a portable device or adapted for fixed mounting in an instrument rack or permanent installation. Packaging for aerospace, marine, or military systems imposes different types of design criteria.

Design and productisation of electronic packages is a multi-disciplinary field based on mechanical engineering principles such as dynamics, stress analysis, heat transfer and fluid mechanics, chemistry, materials science, process engineering, etc. High-reliability equipment often must survive drop tests, loose cargo vibration, secured cargo vibration, extreme temperatures, humidity, water immersion or spray, rain, sunlight (UV, IR and visible light), salt spray, explosive shock, and many more. These requirements extend beyond and interact with the electrical design.

An electronics assembly consists of component devices, circuit card assemblies (CCAs), connectors, cables and components such as transformers, power supplies, relays, switches, etc. that may not mount on the circuit card.

Many electrical products require the manufacturing of high-volume, low-cost parts such as enclosures or covers by techniques such as injection molding, die casting, investment casting, and so on. The design of these products depends on the production method and requires careful consideration of dimensions and tolerances and tooling design. Some parts may be manufactured by specialized processes such as plaster- and sand-casting of metal enclosures.

In the design of electronic products, electronic packaging engineers perform analyses to estimate such things as maximum temperatures for components, structural resonant frequencies, and dynamic stresses and deflections under worst-case environments. Such knowledge is important to prevent immediate or premature electronic product failures.

== Design considerations ==
A designer must balance many objectives and practical considerations when selecting packaging methods.

- Hazards to be protected against: mechanical damage, exposure to weather and dirt, electromagnetic interference, etc.
- Heat dissipation requirements
- Tradeoffs between tooling capital cost and per-unit cost
- Tradeoffs between time to first delivery and production rate
- Availability and capability of suppliers
- User interface design and convenience
- Ease of access to internal parts when required for maintenance
- Product safety, and compliance with regulatory standards
- Aesthetics, and other marketing considerations
- Service life and reliability

== Packaging materials ==
=== Sheet metal ===
Punched and formed sheet metal is one of the oldest types of electronic packaging. It can be mechanically strong, provides electromagnetic shielding when the product requires that feature, and is easily made for prototypes and small production runs with little custom tooling expense.

=== Cast metal ===
Gasketed metal castings are sometimes used to package electronic equipment for exceptionally severe environments, such as in heavy industry, aboard ship, or deep under water. Aluminum die castings are more common than iron or steel sand castings.

=== Machined metal ===
Electronic packages are sometimes made by machining solid blocks of metal, usually aluminum, into complex shapes. They are fairly common in microwave assemblies for aerospace use, where precision transmission lines require complex metal shapes, in combination with hermetically sealed housings. Quantities tend to be small; sometimes only one unit of a custom design is required. Piece part costs are high, but there is little or no cost for custom tooling, and first-piece deliveries can take as little as half a day. The tool of choice is a numerically controlled vertical milling machine, with automatic translation of computer-aided design (CAD) files to toolpath command files.

=== Molded plastic ===
Molded plastic cases and structural parts can be made by a variety of methods, offering tradeoffs in piece part cost, tooling cost, mechanical and electrical properties, and ease of assembly. Examples are injection molding, transfer molding, vacuum forming, and die cutting. Pl can be post-processed to provide conductive surfaces.

=== Potting ===
Also called "encapsulation", potting consists of immersing the part or assembly in a liquid resin, then curing it. Another method puts the part or assembly in a mold, and potting compound is poured in it, and after curing, the mold is not removed, becoming part of the part or assembly. Potting can be done in a pre-molded potting shell, or directly in a mold. Today it is most widely used to protect semiconductor components from moisture and mechanical damage, and to serve as a mechanical structure holding the lead frame and the chip together. In earlier times it was often used to discourage reverse engineering of proprietary products built as printed circuit modules. It is also commonly used in high voltage products to allow live parts to be placed closer together (eliminating corona discharges due to the potting compound's high dielectric strength), so that the product can be smaller. This also excludes dirt and conductive contaminants (such as impure water) from sensitive areas. Another use is to protect deep-submergence items such as sonar transducers from collapsing under extreme pressure, by filling all voids. Potting can be rigid or soft. When void-free potting is required, it is common practice to place the product in a vacuum chamber while the resin is still liquid, hold a vacuum for several minutes to draw the air out of internal cavities and the resin itself, then release the vacuum. Atmospheric pressure collapses the voids and forces the liquid resin into all internal spaces. Vacuum potting works best with resins that cure by polymerization, rather than solvent evaporation.

=== Porosity sealing or impregnation ===
Porosity Sealing or Resin Impregnation is similar to potting, but doesn't use a shell or a mold. Parts are submerged in a polymerizable monomer or solvent-based low viscosity plastic solution. The pressure above the fluid is lowered to a full vacuum. After the vacuum is released, the fluid flows into the part. When the part is withdrawn from the resin bath, it is drained and/or cleaned and then cured. Curing can consist of polymerizing the internal resin or evaporating the solvent, which leaves an insulating dielectric material between different voltage components. Porosity sealing (Resin Impregnation) fills all interior spaces, and may or may not leave a thin coating on the surface, depending on the wash/rinse performance. The main application of vacuum impregnation porosity sealing is in boosting the dielectric strength of transformers, solenoids, lamination stacks or coils, and some high voltage components. It prevents ionization from forming between closely spaced live surfaces and initiating failure.

=== Liquid filling ===
Liquid filling is sometimes used as an alternative to potting or impregnation. It's usually a dielectric fluid, chosen for chemical compatibility with the other materials present. This method is used mostly in very large electrical equipment such as utility transformers, to increase breakdown voltage. It can also be used to improve heat transfer, especially if allowed to circulate by natural convection or forced convection through a heat exchanger. Liquid filling can be removed for repair much more easily than potting.

=== Conformal coating ===
Conformal coating is a thin insulating coating applied by various methods. It provides mechanical and chemical protection of delicate components. It's widely used on mass-produced items such as axial-lead resistors, and sometimes on printed circuit boards. It can be very economical, but somewhat difficult to achieve consistent process quality.

=== Glob-top ===
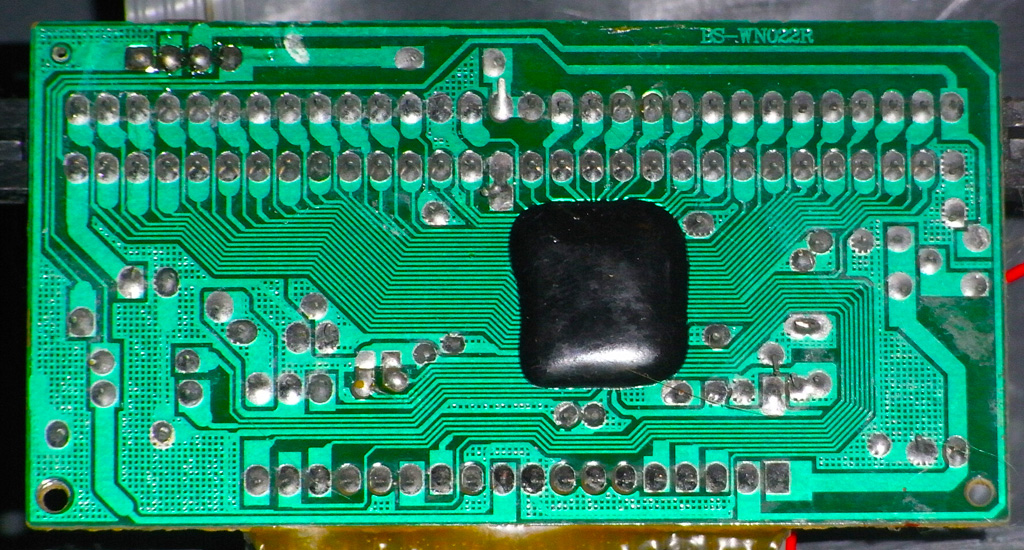
A chip-on-board (COB) covered with dark epoxy

Glob-top is a variant of conformal coating used in chip-on-board assembly (COB). It consists of a drop of specially formulated epoxy or resin deposited over a semiconductor chip and its wire bonds, to provide mechanical support and exclude contaminants such as fingerprint residues which could disrupt circuit operation. It is most commonly used in electronic toys and low-end devices.

=== Chip on board ===
Surface-mounted LEDs are frequently sold in chip-on-board (COB) configurations. In these, the individual diodes are mounted in an array that allows the device to produce a greater amount of luminous flux with greater ability to dissipate the resulting heat in an overall smaller package than can be accomplished by mounting LEDs, even surface mount types, individually on a circuit board.

=== Hermetic metal/glass cases ===
Hermetic metal packaging began life in the vacuum tube industry, where a totally leak-proof housing was essential to operation. This industry developed the glass-seal electrical feedthrough, using alloys such as Kovar to match the coefficient of expansion of the sealing glass so as to minimize mechanical stress on the critical metal-glass bond as the tube warmed up. Some later tubes used metal cases and feedthroughs, and only the insulation around the individual feedthroughs used glass. Today, glass-seal packages are used mostly in critical components and assemblies for aerospace use, where leakage must be prevented even under extreme changes in temperature, pressure, and humidity.

=== Hermetic ceramic packages ===
Packages consisting of a lead frame embedded in a vitreous paste layer between flat ceramic top and bottom covers are more convenient than metal/glass packages for some products, but give equivalent performance. Examples are integrated circuit chips in ceramic Dual In-line Package form, or complex hybrid assemblies of chip components on a ceramic base plate. This type of packaging can also be divided into two main types: multilayer ceramic packages (like LTCC and HTCC) and pressed ceramic packages.

=== Printed circuit assemblies ===
Printed circuits are primarily a technology for connecting components together, but they also provide mechanical structure. In some products, such as computer accessory boards, they're all the structure there is. This makes them part of the universe of electronic packaging.

== Reliability evaluation ==
A typical reliability qualification includes the following types of environmental stresses:

- Burn-in
- Temperature cycling
- Thermal shock
- Solderability
- Autoclave
- Visual inspection
- Hermeticity/moisture resistance
- Hygrothermal test

Hygrothermal test is performed in chambers with temperature and humidity. It is an environmental stress test used in evaluating product reliability. The typical hygrothermal test is 85˚C temperature and 85% relative humidity (abbr. 85˚C/85%RH). During the test, the sample is periodically taken out to test its mechanical or electrical properties. Some research works related to hygrothermal test can be seen in the references.

== See also ==
- Semiconductor package
- Integrated circuit packaging
- Packaging (disambiguation)
- Packaging
