= Power supply unit (computer) =

Internal computer component that provides power to other components

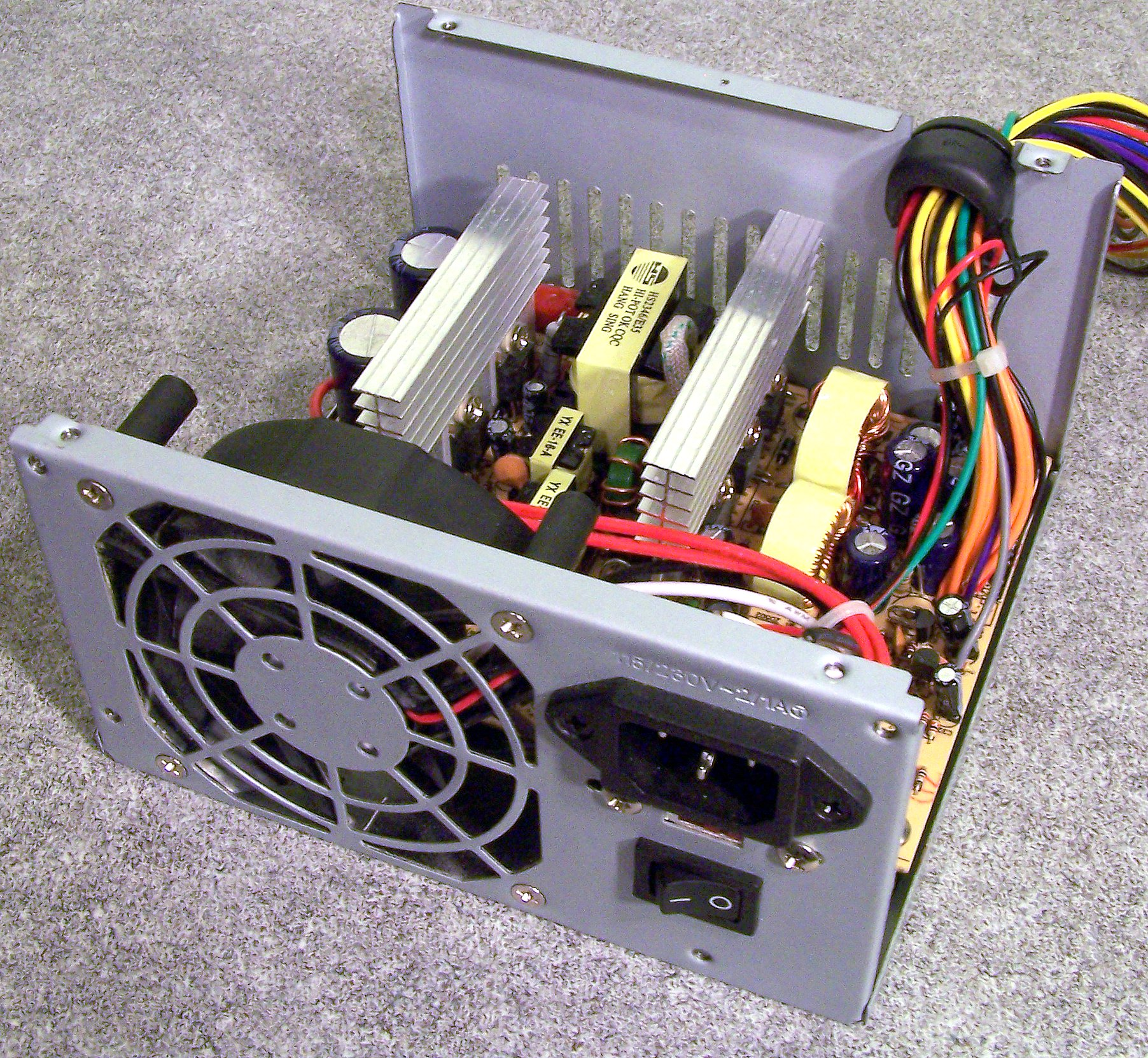
An ATX power supply unit with top cover removed

A power supply unit (PSU) converts mains AC to low-voltage regulated DC power for the internal components of a desktop computer. Modern personal computers universally use switched-mode power supplies. Some power supplies have a manual switch for selecting input voltage, while others automatically adapt to the main voltage.

Most modern desktop personal computer power supplies conform to the ATX specification, which includes form factor and voltage tolerances. While an ATX power supply is connected to the mains supply, it always provides a 5-volt standby (5VSB) power so that the standby functions on the computer and certain peripherals are powered. ATX power supplies are turned on and off by a signal from the motherboard. They also provide a signal to the motherboard to indicate when the DC voltages are in spec, so that the computer is able to safely power up and boot. The most recent ATX PSU standard is version 3.1 as of mid 2025.

== Functions ==
Simplified circuit diagram of a typical PSU

Diagram of a typical XT and AT voltage regulator circuit

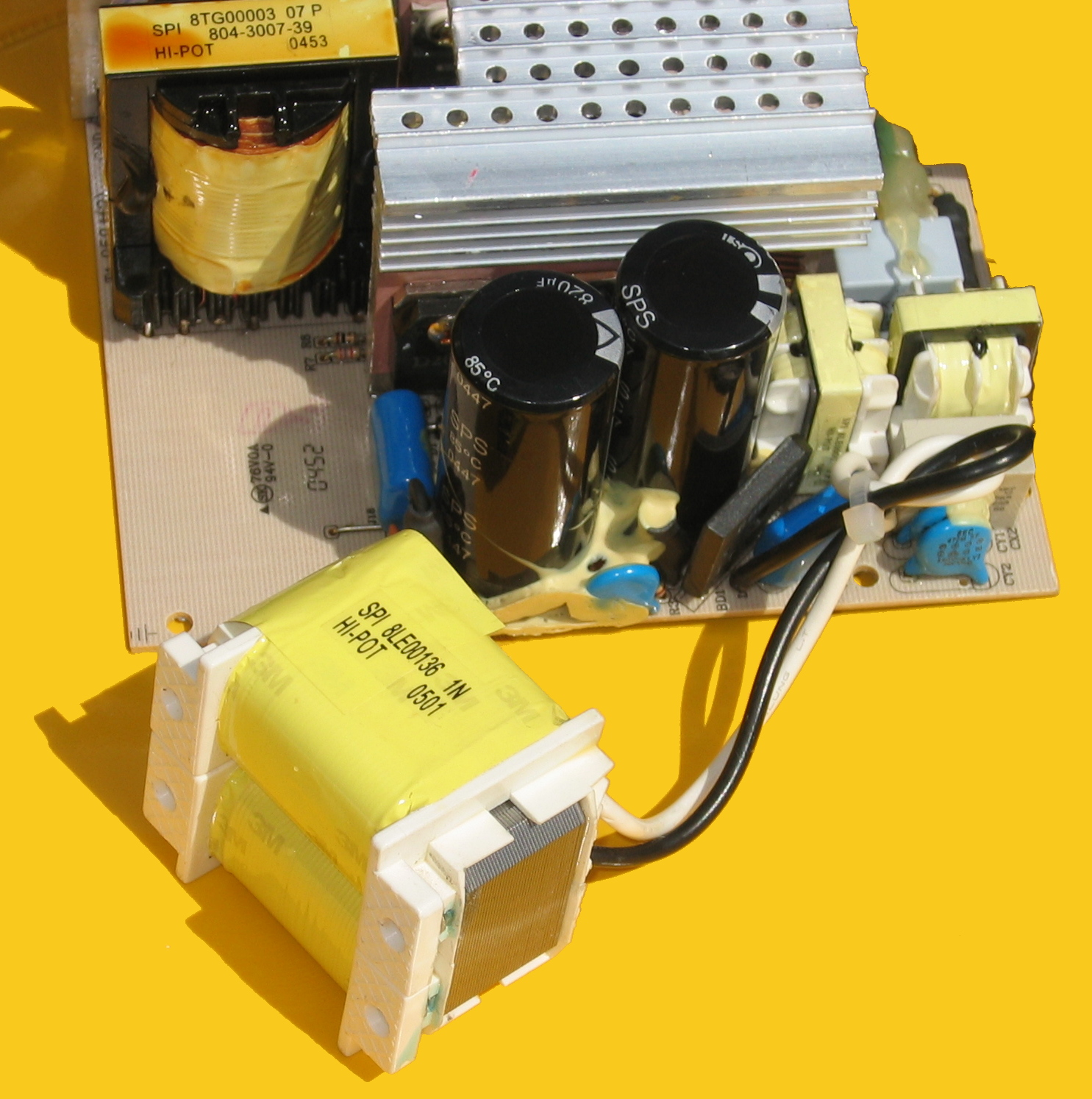
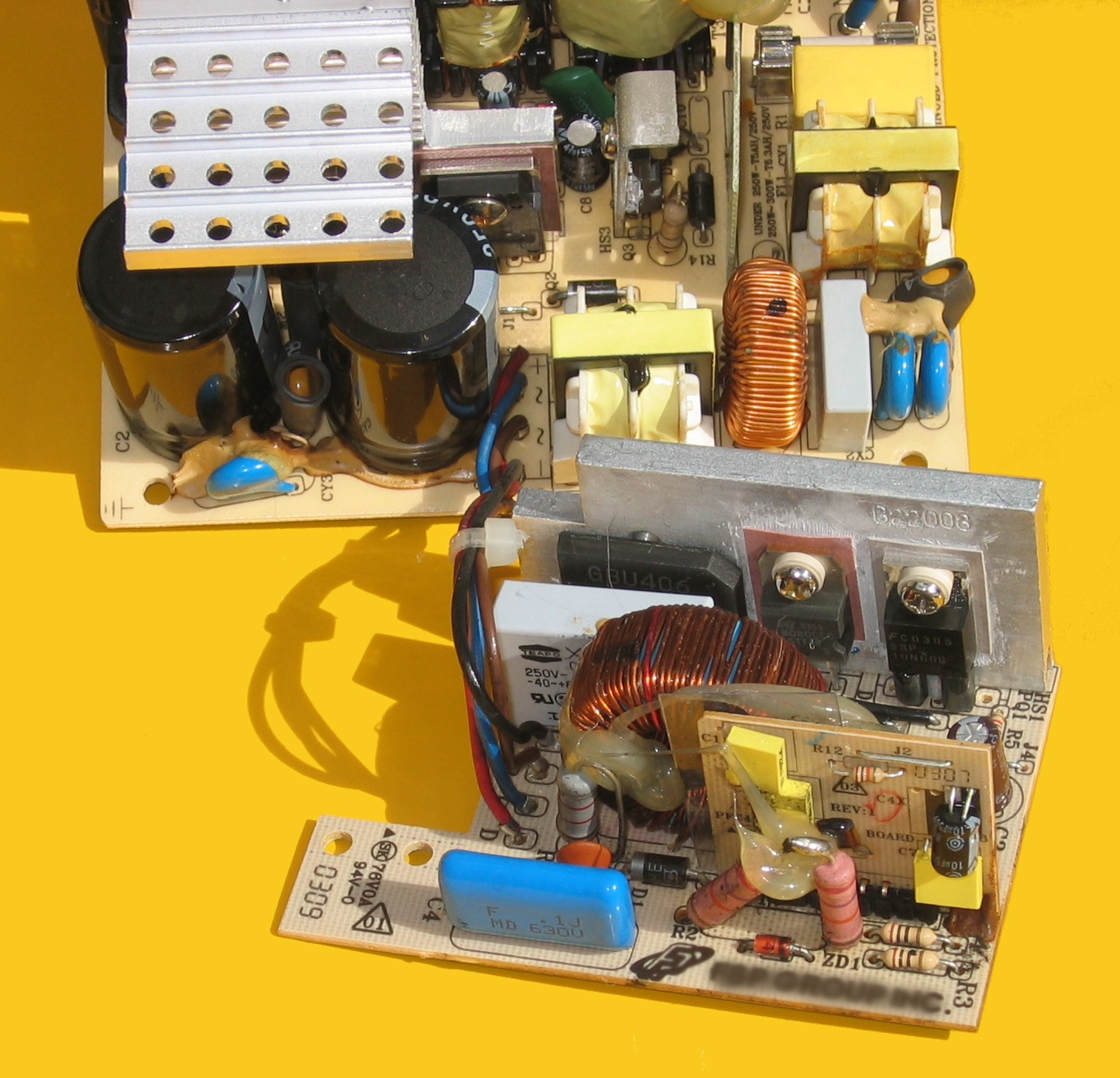
Internals of a PSU with passive PFC (left) and active PFC (right)

The desktop computer power supply converts the alternating current (AC) from a wall socket of mains electricity to a low-voltage direct current (DC) to operate the motherboard, processor and peripheral devices. Several direct-current voltages are required, and they must be regulated with some accuracy to provide stable operation of the computer. A power supply rail or voltage rail refers to a single voltage provided by a PSU.

Some PSUs can also supply a standby voltage, so that most of the computer system can be powered off after preparing for hibernation or shutdown, and powered back on by an event. Standby power allows a computer to be started remotely via wake-on-LAN and Wake-on-ring or locally via Keyboard Power ON (KBPO) if the motherboard supports it. This standby voltage may be generated by a small linear power supply inside the unit or a switching power supply, sharing some components with the main unit to save cost and energy.

== History ==
First-generation microcomputer and home computer power supply units used a heavy step-down transformer and a linear power supply, as used, in for example, the Commodore PET introduced in 1977. The Apple II, also introduced in 1977, was noted for its switched-mode power supply, which was lighter and smaller than an equivalent linear power supply would have been, and which had no cooling fan. The switched-mode supply uses a ferrite-cored high frequency transformer and power transistors that switch thousands of times per second. By adjusting the switching time of the transistor, the output voltage can be closely controlled without dissipating energy as heat in a linear regulator. The development of high-power and high-voltage transistors at economical prices made it practical to introduce switched-mode supplies that had been used in aerospace, mainframes, minicomputers and color television, into desktop personal computers. The Apple II design by Atari engineer Rod Holt was awarded a patent, and was in the vanguard of modern computer power supply design. Now all modern computers use switched-mode power supplies, which are lighter, less costly, and more efficient than equivalent linear power supplies.

Computer power supplies may have short circuit protection, overpower (overload) protection, over-voltage protection, under-voltage protection, over-current protection, and over-temperature protection.

=== Input voltage switch ===
Power supplies designed for worldwide use were once equipped with an input voltage selector switch that allowed the user to configure the unit for use on local power grid. In the lower voltage range, around 115 V, this switch is turned on changing the power grid voltage rectifier into a voltage doubler in Delon circuit design. As a result, the large primary filter capacitor behind that rectifier was split up into two capacitors wired in series, balanced with bleeder resistors and varistors that were necessary in the upper input voltage range, around 230 V. Connecting the unit configured for the lower range to a higher-voltage grid usually resulted in immediate permanent damage. When a power-factor correction (PFC) was required, those filter capacitors were replaced with higher-capacity ones, together with a coil installed in series to delay the inrush current. This is the simple design of a passive PFC.

Active PFC is more complex and can achieve higher PF, up to 0.99 or higher. The first active PFC circuits just delayed the inrush. Newer ones work as an input and output condition-controlled step-up converter, supplying a single 400 V filter capacitor from a wide-range input source, usually between 80 and 240 V. Newer PFC circuits also replace the NTC-based inrush current limiter, which is an expensive part previously located next to the fuse.

== Development ==
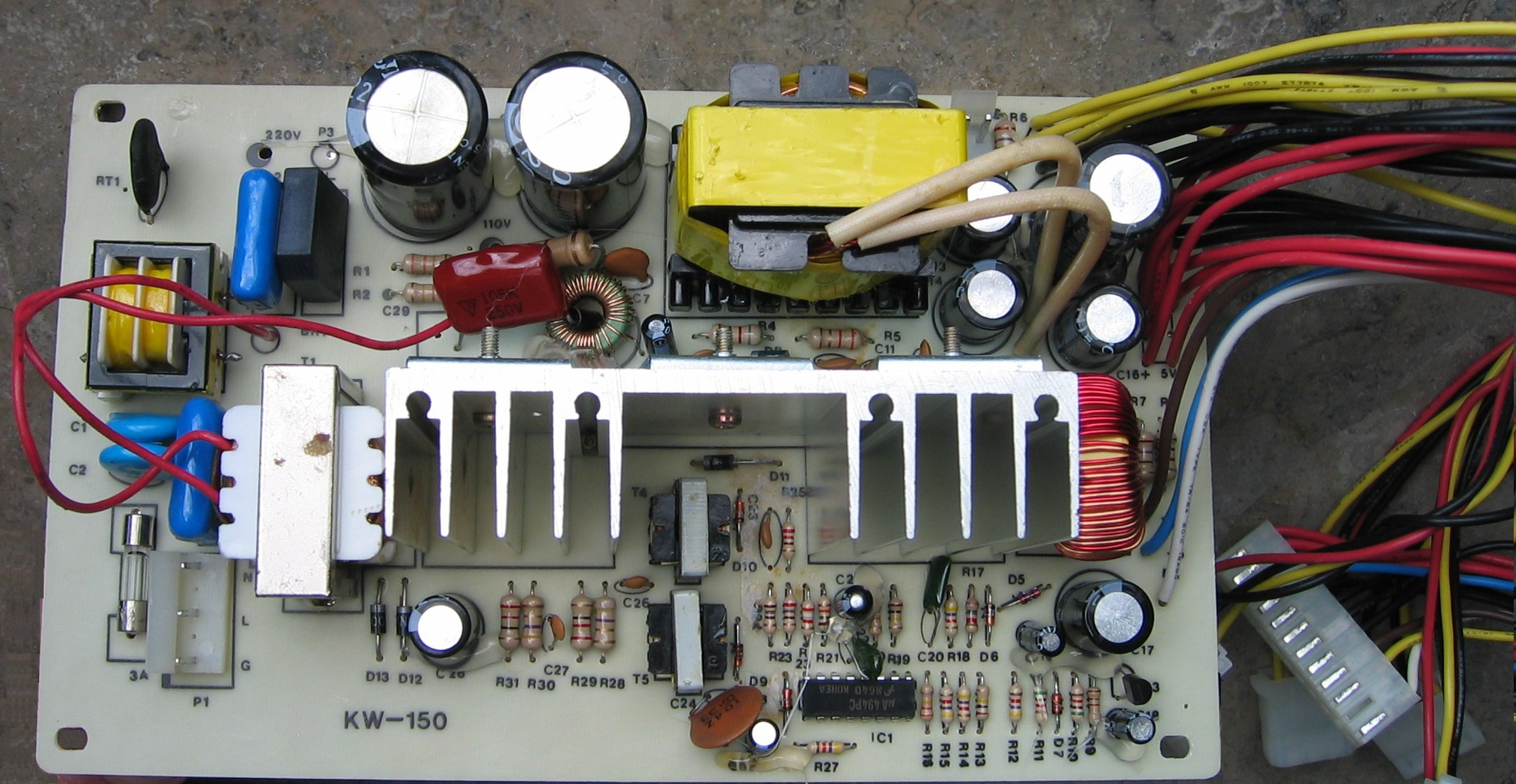
PCB of a power supply from an IBM XT clone

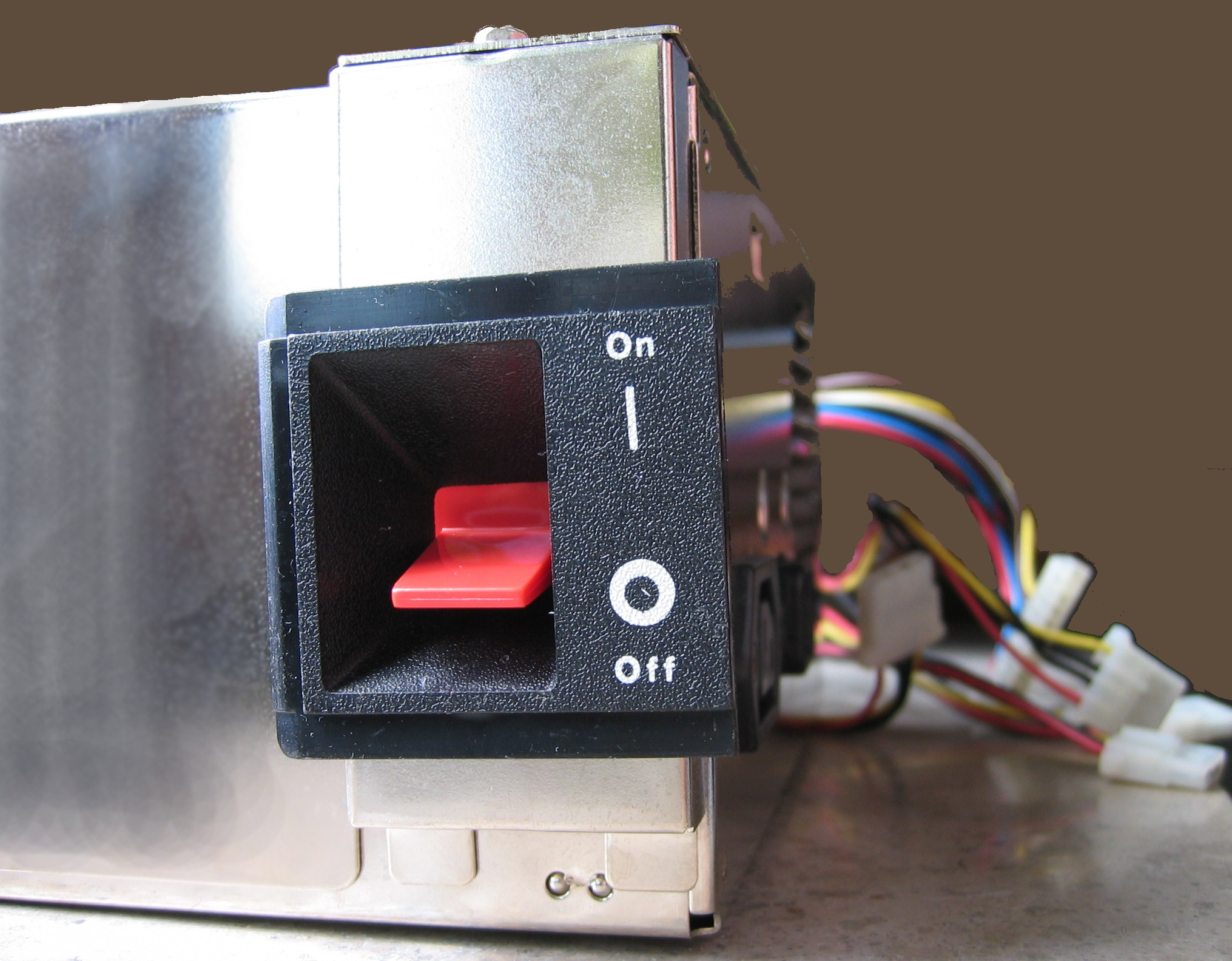
A typical XT PSU power switch, which is an integral part of the PSU

=== Original IBM PC, XT and AT standard ===
The first IBM PC power supply unit (PSU) supplied two main voltages: +5 V and +12 V. It supplied two other voltages, −5 V and −12 V, but with limited amounts of power. Most microchips of the time operated on 5 V power. Of the 63.5 W these PSUs could deliver, most of it was on this +5 V rail.

The +12 V supply was used primarily to operate motors such as in disk drives and cooling fans. As more peripherals were added, more power was delivered on the 12 V rail. However, since most of the power is consumed by chips, the 5 V rail still delivered most of the power. The −12 V rail was used primarily to provide the negative supply voltage to the RS-232 serial ports. A −5 V rail was provided for peripherals on the ISA bus (such as soundcards), but was not used by any motherboard other than the original IBM PC motherboard.

An additional wire referred to as 'Power Good' is used to prevent digital circuitry operation during the initial milliseconds of power supply turn-on, where output voltages and currents are rising but not yet sufficient or stable for proper device operation. Once the output power is ready to use, the Power Good signal tells the digital circuitry that it can begin to operate.

Original IBM power supplies for the PC (model 5150), XT and AT included a line-voltage power switch that extended through the side of the computer case. In a common variant found in tower cases, the line-voltage switch was connected to the power supply with a short cable, allowing it to be mounted apart from the power supply.

An early microcomputer power supply was either fully on or off, controlled by the mechanical line-voltage switch, and energy saving low-power idle modes were not a design consideration of early computer power supplies. These power supplies were generally not capable of power saving modes such as standby or "soft off", or scheduled turn-on power controls.

Due to the always-on design, in the event of a short circuit, either a fuse would blow, or a switched-mode supply would repeatedly cut the power, wait a brief period of time, and attempt to restart. For some power supplies the repeated restarting is audible as a quiet rapid chirping or ticking emitted from the device.

=== ATX standard ===
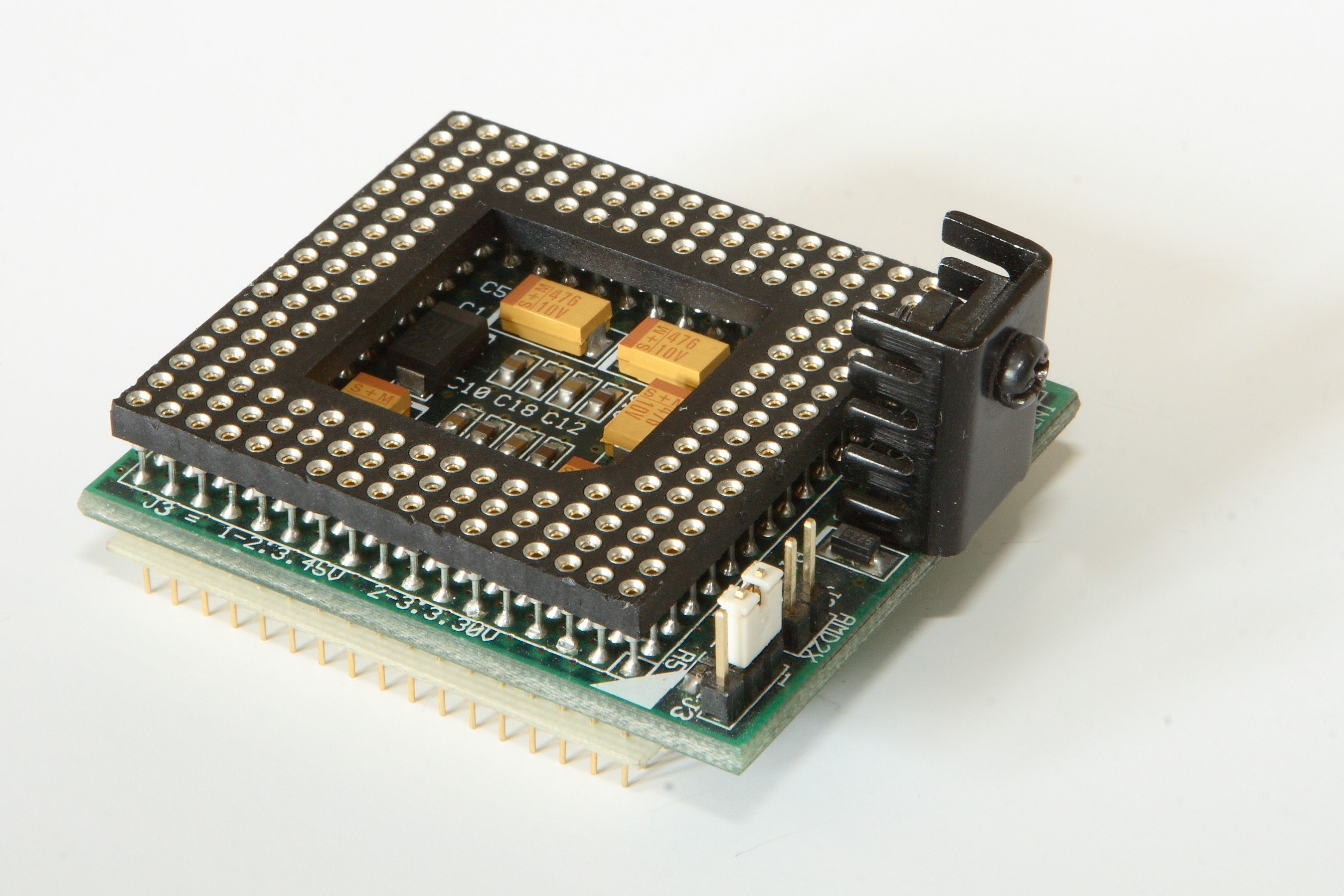
Voltage converter for 80486DX4 processors (5 V to 3.3 V). Note the heat sink on the linear regulator, required to dissipate the wasted power.

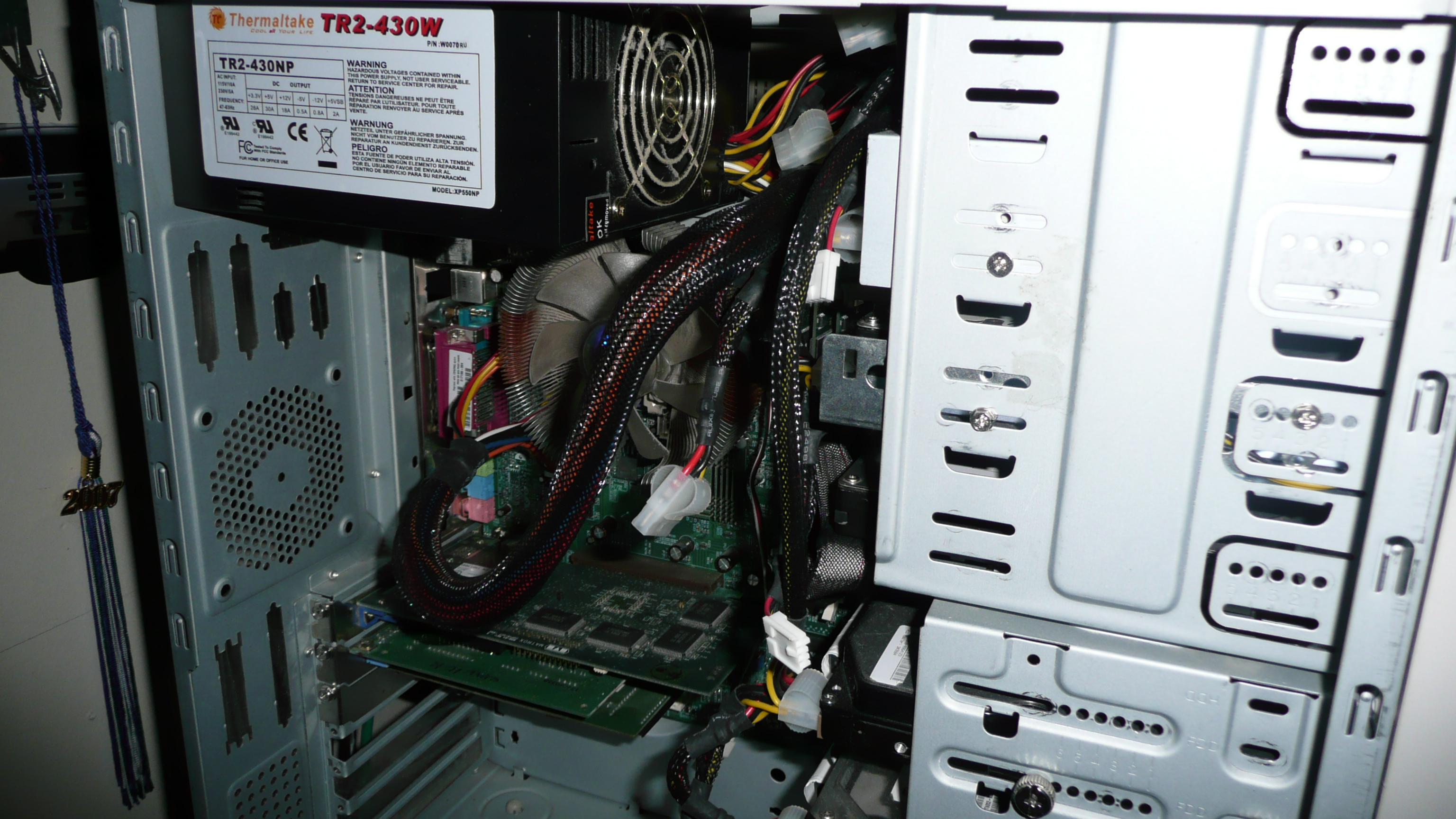
A typical installation of an ATX form factor computer power supply

When Intel developed the ATX standard power supply connector (published in 1995), microchips operating on 3.3 V were becoming more popular, beginning with the Intel 80486DX4 microprocessor in 1994, and the ATX standard supplies three positive rails: +3.3 V, +5 V, and +12 V. Earlier computers requiring 3.3 V typically derived that from a simple but inefficient linear regulator connected to the +5 V rail.

The ATX connector provides multiple wires and power connections for the 3.3 V supply, because it is most sensitive to voltage drop in the supply connections. Another ATX addition was the +5 V SB (standby) rail for providing a small amount of standby power, even when the computer was nominally "off".

When a computer is in ACPI S3 sleep mode, only +5 V SB rail is used.

There are two basic differences between AT and ATX power supplies: the connectors that provide power to the motherboard, and the soft switch. In ATX-style systems, the front-panel power switch provides only a control signal to the power supply and does not switch the mains AC voltage. This low-voltage control allows other computer hardware or software to turn the system on and off.

Since ATX power supplies share both the same dimensions (150 × 86 mm (5.9 × 3.4 in)) and the same mounting layout (four screws arranged on the back side of the unit), with the prior format, there is no major physical difference preventing an AT case from accepting an ATX PSU (or vice versa, if the case can host the power switch needed by an AT PSU), provided that the specific PSU is not too long for the specific case.

==== ATX12V standard ====
As transistors become smaller on chips, it becomes preferable to operate them on lower supply voltages, and the lowest supply voltage is often desired by the densest chip, the central processing unit. In order to supply large amounts of low-voltage power to the Pentium and subsequent microprocessors, a special power supply, the voltage regulator module began to be included on motherboards. Newer processors may require over 200 A at 1.5 V or less, which is impractical to deliver from off-board power supplies.

Initially, this was supplied by the main +5 V supply, but as power demands increased, the high currents required to supply sufficient power became problematic. To reduce the power losses in the 5 V supply, with the introduction of the Pentium 4 microprocessor, Intel changed the processor power supply to operate on +12 V, and added the separate four-pin P4 connector to the new ATX12V 1.0 standard to supply that power.

Modern high-powered graphics processing units do the same thing, resulting in most of the power requirement of a modern personal computer being on the +12 V rail. When high-powered GPUs were first introduced, typical ATX power supplies were "5 V-heavy", and could only supply 50–60% of their output in the form of 12 V power. Thus, GPU manufacturers, to ensure 200–250 W of 12 V power (peak load, CPU+GPU), recommended power supplies of 500–600 W or higher. More modern ATX power supplies can deliver almost all (typically 80–90%) of their total rated capacity in the form of +12 V power.

Because of this change, it is important to consider the +12 V supply capacity, rather than the overall power capacity, when using an older ATX power supply with a more recent computer.

Low-quality power supply manufacturers sometimes take advantage of this overspecification by assigning unrealistically high power supply ratings, knowing that very few customers fully understand power supply ratings.

==== +3.3 V and +5 V rails ====
+3.3 V and +5 V rail voltage supplies are rarely a limiting factor; generally, any supply with a sufficient +12 V rating will have adequate capacity at lower voltages. However, most hard drives or PCI cards will create a greater load on the +5 V rail.

Older CPUs and logic devices on the motherboard were designed for 5 V operating voltage. Power supplies for those computers regulate the 5 V output precisely, and supply the 12 V rail in a specified voltage window depending on the load ratio of both rails. The +12 V supply was used for computer fan motors, disk drive motors and serial interfaces (which also used the −12 V supply). A further use of the 12 V came with the sound cards, using linear chip audio power amplifiers, sometimes filtered by a 9 V linear regulator on the card to cut the noise of the motors.

Since certain i386 variant CPUs use lower operating voltages such as 3.3 or 3.45 V, motherboards had linear voltage regulators supplied by the 5 V rail. Jumpers or dip switches set the output voltages to the installed CPU's specification. When newer CPUs required higher currents, switching mode voltage regulators like buck converters replaced linear regulators for efficiency.

Since the first revision of the ATX standard, PSUs were required to have a 3.3 V output voltage rail. Rarely, a linear regulator generated these, supplied from the 5 V and converting the product of voltage drop and current to heat. Later regulators managed all the 3.3, 5 and 12 V rails.

As CPUs increased in current consumption (due to higher static current due to higher transistor count and much higher dynamic current due to both higher count and switching frequency) in CPU generations after the i386, it became necessary to place voltage regulators close to the CPU.

==== Entry-Level Power Supply Specification ====
Entry-Level Power Supply Specification (EPS) is a power supply unit meant for high-power-consumption computers and entry-level servers. Developed by the Server System Infrastructure (SSI) forum, a group of companies including Intel, Dell, Hewlett-Packard and others, that works on server standards, the EPS form factor is a derivative of the ATX form factor. The latest specification is v2.93.

The EPS standard provides a more powerful and stable environment for critical server-based systems and applications. EPS power supplies have a 24-pin motherboard power connector and an eight-pin +12 V connector. The standard also specifies two additional four-pin 12 V connectors for more power-hungry boards (one required on 700–800 W PSUs, both required on 850 W+ PSUs). EPS power supplies are in principle compatible with standard ATX or ATX12V motherboards found in homes and offices but there may be mechanical issues where the 12 V connector and in the case of older boards connector overhang the sockets. Many PSU vendors use connectors where the extra sections can be unclipped to avoid this issue. As with later versions of the ATX PSU standard, there is also no −5 V rail.

==== Single vs. multiple +12 V rail ====
Rail	Color mark
12V1	Yellow (black)
12V2	Yellow
12V3	Yellow (blue)
12V4	Yellow (green)

As power supply capacity increased, the ATX power supply standard was amended (beginning with version 2.0) to include:

3.2.4. Power Limit / Hazardous Energy Levels
Under normal or overload conditions, no output shall continuously provide more than 240 VA under any conditions of load including output short circuit, per the requirement of UL 1950 / CSA 950 / EN 60950 / IEC 950.

— ATX12V Power Supply Design Guide, version 2.2

The requirement was later deleted from version 2.3 (March 2007) of the ATX12V power supply specifications, but led to a distinction in modern ATX power supplies between single and multiple rails.

The rule was intended to set a safe limit on the current able to pass through any single output wire. A sufficiently large current can cause serious damage in the event of a short circuit, or can melt the wire or its insulation in the case of a fault, or potentially start a fire or damage other components. The rule limits each output to below 20 amps, with typical supplies guaranteeing 18 A availability. Power supplies capable of delivering more than 18 A at 12 V would provide their output in groups of cables (called "rails"). Each rail delivers up to a limited amount of current through one or more cables, and each rail is independently controlled by its own current sensor which shuts down the supply upon excess current. Unlike a fuse or circuit breaker, these limits reset as soon as the overload is removed. Typically, a power supply will guarantee at least 17 A at 12 V by having a current limit of 18.5 A ± 8%. Thus, it is guaranteed to supply at least 17 A, and guaranteed to cut off before 20 A. The current limits for each group of cables is then documented so the user can avoid placing too many high-current loads in the same group.

Originally at the time of ATX 2.0, a power supply featuring "multiple +12 V rails" implied one able to deliver more than 20 A of +12 V power, and was seen as a good thing. However, people found the need to balance loads across many +12 V rails inconvenient, especially as higher-end PSUs began to deliver far greater currents up to around 2000 W, or more than 150 A at 12 V (compared to the 240 or 500 W of earlier times). When the assignment of connectors to rails is done at manufacturing time it is not always possible to move a given load to a different rail or manage the allocation of current across devices.

Rather than add more current limit circuits, many manufacturers chose to ignore the requirement and increase the current limits above 20 A per rail, or provided "single-rail" power supplies that omit the current limit circuitry. (In some cases, in violation of their own advertising claims to include it.) Because of the above standards, almost all high-power supplies claimed to implement separate rails, however this claim was often false; many omitted the necessary current-limit circuitry, both for cost reasons and because it is an irritation to customers. (The lack was, and is, sometimes advertised as a feature under names like "rail fusion" or "current sharing".)

The requirement was withdrawn as a result, however, the issue left its mark on PSU designs, which can be categorized into single rail and multiple rail designs. Both may (and often do) contain current limiting controllers. As of ATX 2.31, a single rail design's output current can be drawn through any combination of output cables, and the management and safe allocation of that load is left for the user. A multiple rail design does the same, but limits the current supplied to each individual connector (or group of connectors), and the limits it imposes are the manufacturer's choice rather than set by the ATX standard.

=== 12 V-only supplies ===
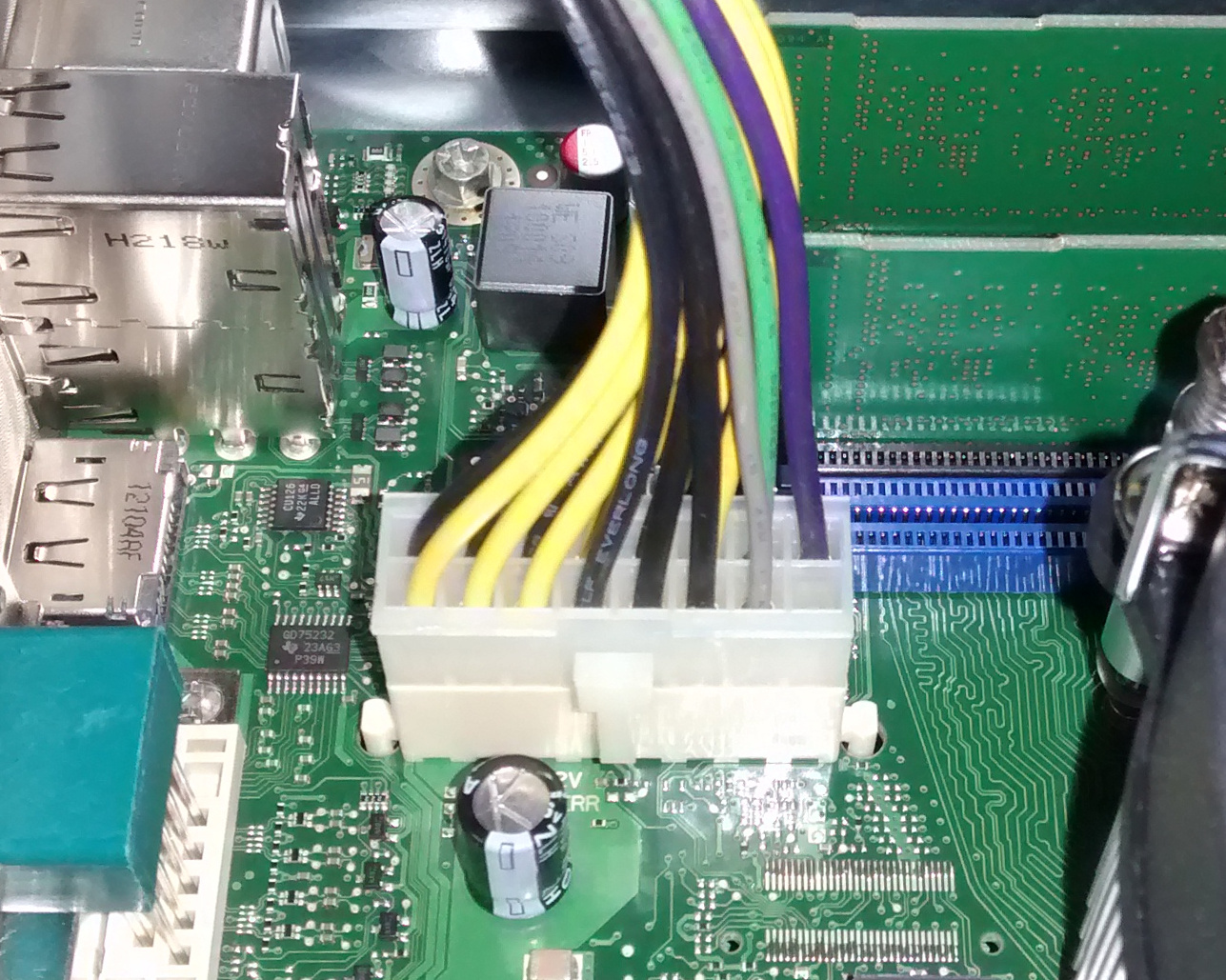
12 V only connector on a Fujitsu mainboard

Connector ATX12VO

Since 2011, Fujitsu and other tier-1 manufacturers have been manufacturing systems containing motherboard variants that require only a 12 V supply from a custom-made PSU, which is typically rated at 250–300 W. DC-to-DC conversion, providing 5 V and 3.3 V, is done on the motherboard using voltage regulator modules. Google has shared that it's been using 12 V-only PSUs in its server fleet since around 2003.

The reasons given for this approach to power supply are that it eliminates cross-load problems, simplifies and reduces internal wiring that can affect airflow and cooling, reduces costs, increases power supply efficiency, and reduces noise by bringing the power supply fan speed under the control of the motherboard.

At least two of Dell's business PCs introduced in 2013, the OptiPlex 9020 and Precision T1700, ship with 12 V–only power supplies and implement 5 V and 3.3 V conversion exclusively on the motherboard. Afterwards, Lenovo ThinkCentre M93P adopted 12 V–only PSU and performs 5 V and 3.3 V conversion exclusively on the IS8XM motherboard.

In 2019, Intel released a new standard based on an all-12V design: ATX12VO. The power supply only provides 12 V voltage output; 5 V, 3.3 V powers, as needed by USB, hard disk drive and other devices, are transformed on the motherboard; and the ATX motherboard connector is reduced from 24-pin to 10-pin. Called ATX12VO, it is not expected to replace current standards but to exist alongside it. At CES 2020, FSP Group showed the first prototype based on the new ATX12VO standard.

According to the Single Rail Power Supply ATX12VO design guide officially published by Intel in May 2020, the guide listed the details of 12V-only design and the major benefit which included higher efficiency and lower electrical interruption.

== Power rating ==
The overall power draw on a PSU is limited by the fact that all of the supply rails come through one transformer and any of its primary side circuitry, like switching components. Total power requirements for a personal computer may range from 250 W to more than 1000 W for a high-performance computer with multiple graphics cards. Personal computers without especially high performing CPUs or graphics cards for the 2000s usually require 300 to 500 W.

Power supplies are designed around 40% greater than the calculated system power consumption. This protects against system performance degradation, and against power supply overloading. Power supplies label their total rated power output, and label how this is determined by the electric current limits for each of the voltages supplied. Some power supplies have no overload protection, though current ATX and ATX12VO power specifications both require one to be present.

=== System power consumption ===
The system power consumption is a sum of the power ratings for all of the components of the computer system that draw on the power supply. Some graphics cards (especially multiple cards) and large groups of hard drives can place very heavy demands on the 12 V lines of the PSU, and for these loads, the PSU's 12 V rating is crucial. The total 12 V rating on the power supply must be higher than the current required by such devices so that the PSU can fully serve the system when its other 12 V system components are taken into account. The manufacturers of these computer system components, especially graphics cards, tend to over-rate their power requirements, to minimize support issues due to too low of a power supply.

==== Peak vs. thermal ====
For CPUs and GPUs, the most readily accessible power rating is the thermal design power (TDP). However, the TDP reflects a value used in thermal design, where a heat sink is present to smooth out any peak in heat emission, but the capacitors present in a PSU is far from having similar smoothing ability. As a result, a PSU that theoretically fits the sum of TDPs may still trigger its overload protection (over-current protection, OCP and over-power protection, OPP) on high loads, causing a system reboot or shutdown.

A very common example of spiky power draw is in frame-limited gaming, where each frame is associated with a spike in CPU, then GPU, power draw. This issue is lessened on gaming consoles as the peaks of CPU and GPU power draw can be made to not overlap through scheduling. Current PCs do not have this feature.

The peak power draw of a 2010s CPU is often quoted at 1.5× its TDP. The use of "dynamic overclocking" features such as Intel Turbo Boost have caused some ambiguity in the meaning of TDP, but additional power limit settings such as PL2 (Intel) and PPT/TDC (AMD) remain accessible for obtaining a better estimate of the true thermal power limit; with PL4 and EDC available for the true peak power limit.

GPUs show even more dramatic power consumption spikes: an Nvidia RTX 2070 Super with 215 W TDP generates peak draws of 430 W in frame-limited gaming. Furthermore, the two major GPU vendors (Nvidia and AMD) do not provide peak power draw data to end-users, even though Nvidia is known to have "Input EDP Peak" information in their internal specifications. Instead, the manufacturers would provide an opaque "PSU recommendation" for each GPU model, a rating that includes a whole hypothetical system. Peak power becomes only accessible to end users through third-party measurements, which require high-speed oscilloscopes and current probes.

Although this issue can be solved by purchasing higher-rated PSUs that satisfy the peak power draw, a better solution is to design the PSU to tolerate this spiky load by avoiding oversensitive OCP and OPP, a direction most 2020 PSUs err in. For 2018 PSUs, it appears that peaks under 2 milliseconds can largely be ignored. As of 2019, the amount of excess capacity from protection circuits is not yet standardized or reported on consumer PSUs and third-party reviews are required for now. Server power supply standards such as CRPS do define the minimum amount of excess capacity.

Since ATX 3.0 (2022), there is a basic requirement for the PSU to handle power excursion (short-term peak loads that exceed the stated maximum (sustained) permitted power) on the PCIe power connectors, due an add-on Engineering Change Notice (ECN) to PCIe CEM 5.0. For the external connectors, an ATX 3.0 PSU must be able to handle a 100-microsecond power draw at 3× of maximum sustained power, decreasing to 1× at the 1-second window. A broader change has been incorporated into PCIe CEM 5.1 for all add-in card power connectors, which is used by ATX 3.1. This change also defines power excursion for PCIe slot power at 2.5× over 100 μs.

=== Distribution of rated power ===
The +12V power may be divided into several independent rails, marked +12V1, +12V2, +12V3, +12V4, etc. Each rail may become independently overloaded.

When there are two rails that share power through down-regulating, it also happens that either the 12 V rail or the 5 V rail overloads at well below the total rating of the power supply. Many power supplies create their 3.3 V output by down-regulating their 5 V rail, or create 5 V output by down-regulating their 12 V rails. The two rails involved are labeled on the power supply with a combined current limit. For example, the 5 V and 3.3 V rails are rated with a combined total current limit. For a description of the potential problem, a 3.3 V rail may have a 10 A rating by itself (33 W), and the 5 V rail may have a 20 A rating (100 W) by itself, but the two together may only be able to output 110 W. In this case, loading the 3.3 V rail to maximum (33 W), would leave the 5 V rail only able to output 77 W.

=== Fraud ===
A power supply that is self-certified by its manufacturer may claim output ratings double or more than what is actually provided.

== Efficiency ==
Various initiatives exist to improve the efficiency of computer power supplies. Climate Savers Computing Initiative promotes energy saving and reduction of greenhouse gas emissions by encouraging development and use of more efficient power supplies. 80 Plus certifies a variety of efficiency levels for power supplies and encourages their use via financial incentives. Efficient power supplies also save money by wasting less power; as a result, they use less electricity to power the same computer, and they emit less waste heat which results significant energy savings on central air conditioning in the summer. The gains of using an efficient power supply are more substantial in computers that use a lot of power.

Although a power supply with a larger than needed power rating will have an extra margin of safety against overloading, such a unit is often less efficient and wastes more electricity at lower loads than a more appropriately sized unit. For example, a 900-watt power supply with the 80 Plus Silver efficiency rating (which means that such a power supply is designed to be at least 85% efficient for loads above 180 W) may only be 73% efficient when the load is lower than 100 W, which is a typical idle power for a desktop computer. Thus, for a 100 W load, losses for this supply would be 27 W; if the same power supply was put under a 450 W load, for which the supply's efficiency peaks at 89%, the loss would be only 56 W despite supplying 4.5 times the useful power. For a comparison, a 500-watt power supply carrying the 80 Plus Bronze efficiency rating (which means that such a power supply is designed to be at least 82% efficient for loads above 100 W) may provide an 84% efficiency for a 100 W load, wasting only 19 W. Other ratings such as 80 Plus Gold, 80 Plus Platinum and 80 Plus Titanium also provide the same ratings respectively. 80 Plus Gold provides an 87% efficiency under 100% load, 80 Plus Platinum provides a 90% efficiency and 80 Plus Titanium provides the best efficiency of 94% at 50% load at 115 V and 95.4% at 50% load at 230 V.

A test in 2005 revealed computer power supplies are generally about 70–80% efficient. For a 75% efficient power supply to produce 75 W of DC output it would require 100 W of AC input and dissipate the remaining 25 W in heat. Higher-quality power supplies can be over 80% efficient; as a result, energy-efficient PSUs waste less energy in heat and require less airflow to cool, resulting in quieter operation.

As of 2012 some high-end consumer PSUs can exceed 90% efficiency at optimal load levels, though will fall to 87–89% efficiency during heavy or light loads. Google's server power supplies are more than 90% efficient. HP's server power supplies have reached 94% efficiency. Standard PSUs sold for server workstations have around 90% efficiency, as of 2010.

The energy efficiency of a power supply drops significantly at low loads. Therefore, it is important to match the capacity of a power supply to the power needs of the computer. Efficiency generally peaks at about 50–75% load. The curve varies from model to model. Examples of how this curve looks can be seen on test reports of energy-efficient models found on the 80 Plus website.

== Appearance ==
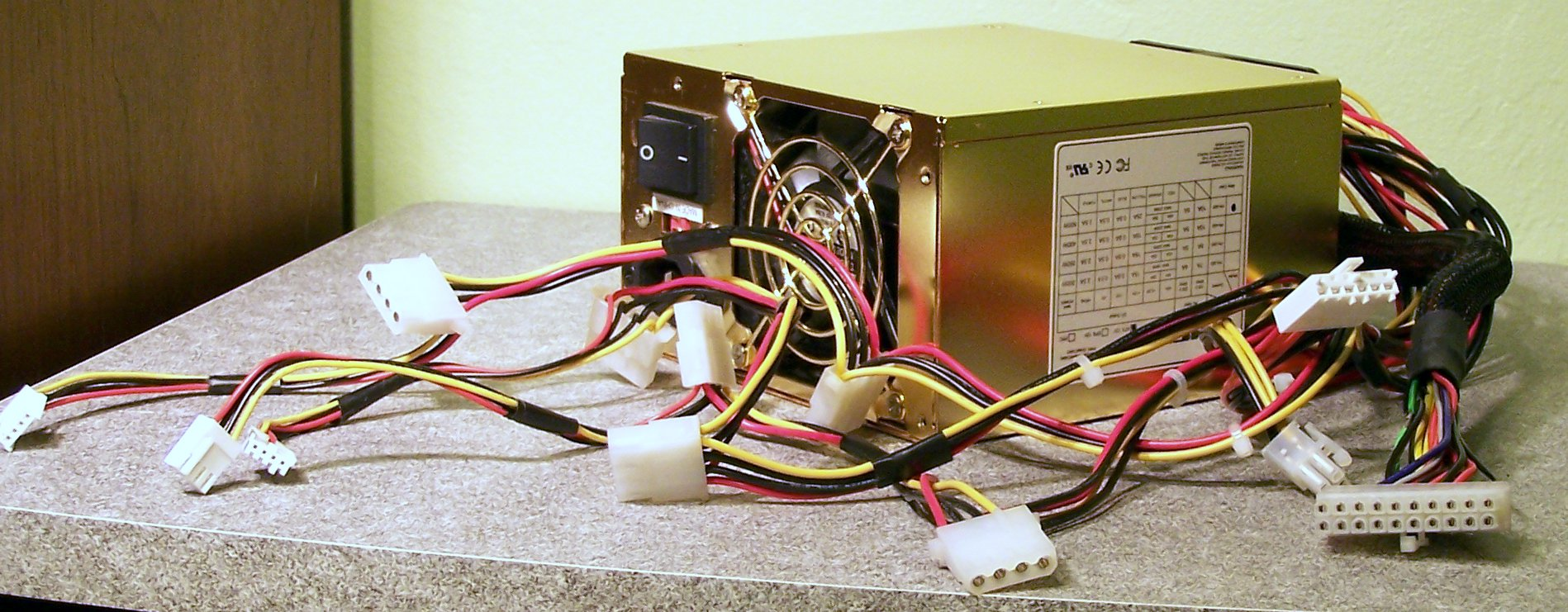
Various connectors available from a computer PSU

PSU dimensions
PSU standard	Width (mm)	Height (mm)	Depth (mm)	Volume (l)
ATX12V / BTX	150	86	140	1.806
LPX / PS/2	150	86	140	1.806
ATX large	150	86	180	2.322
ATX – EPS	150	86	230	2.967
CFX12V	101.6+48.4	86	96	0.838+0.399
SFX12V	125	63.5	100	0.793
SFX-L	125	63.5	130	1.03
TFX12V	85	64	175	0.952
LFX12V	62	72	210	0.937
FlexATX	81.5	40.5	150	0.495

Most desktop personal computer power supplies are a square metal box, and have a large bundle of wires emerging from one end. Opposite the wire bundle is the back face of the power supply, with an air vent and an IEC 60320 C14 connector to supply AC power. There may be a power switch and/or a voltage selector switch. Historically they were mounted on the upper part of the computer case, and had two fans: one, inside the case, pulling air towards the power supply, and another, extracting air from the power supply to the outside. Many power supplies have a single large fan inside the case, and are mounted on the bottom part of the case. The fan may be always on, or turn on and vary its speed depending on the load. Some have no fans, hence are cooled passively.

A label on one side of the box lists technical information about the power supply, including safety certifications and maximum output power. Common certification marks for safety are the UL mark, GS mark, TÜV, NEMKO, SEMKO, DEMKO, FIMKO, CCC, CSA, VDE, GOST R mark and BSMI. Common certificate marks for EMI/RFI are the CE mark, FCC and C-tick. The CE mark is required for power supplies sold in Europe and India. A RoHS or 80 Plus can also sometimes be seen.

Dimensions of an ATX power supply are 150 mm width, 86 mm height, and typically 140 mm depth, although the depth can vary from brand to brand.

Some power supplies come with sleeved cables, which besides being more aesthetically pleasing, also make wiring easier and have a less detrimental effect on airflow.

=== Connectors ===
Typically, power supplies have the following connectors (all are Molex (USA) Inc Mini-Fit Jr, unless otherwise indicated):

- ATX Main Power Connector (usually labelled P1): This is the connector that goes to the motherboard to provide it with power. The connector has 20 pins or (since ATX12V 2.0) 24 pins. One of the pins belongs to the PS-ON wire (it is usually green). This connector is the largest of all the connectors. In older AT power supplies, this connector was split in two: P8 and P9. A power supply with a 24-pin connector can be used on a motherboard with a 20-pin connector. In cases where the motherboard has a 24-pin connector, some power supplies come with two connectors (one with 20-pin and other with 4-pin, i.e. 20+4-pin form) which can be used together to form the 24-pin connector. The EPS12V specification refers to the 24-pin connector as the P1 Baseboard Power Connector.
- 12V only power connector (labelled P1, though it is not compatible with the ATX 20 or 24 pin connector): This is a 10-pin Molex connector supplying the motherboard with three 12 V lines with common returns, a power good signal, a PS_ON signal, an I_PSU% (PSU load percentage relative to rated) signal, and a 12 V auxiliary supply. One +12V supply also acts as the voltage sensing channel.
- 12V only Extra Board Connector: mechanically and electrically identical to the 12 V PCIe connector, this connector provides up to 216 to 288 watts of extra 12 V power to the motherboard. The pin assignment is slightly different (the EBC has no sense pin), so undetected misuse is unlikely.
- EPS12V connectors: These 4-pin or 8-pin connectors go to the motherboard to supply +12 V power for the CPU.
  - 4-pin (2x2) ATX12V power connector (also P4 power connector or +12V Power 4-pin Connector): A second connector that goes to the motherboard (in addition to the 24-pin ATX motherboard connector) to supply dedicated power for the processor. The EPS12V specification refers to this connector as the +12V4 and +12V5 Baseboard Power Connector, in the context of the possibility of two instances of the connector.
  - 8-pin (2x4) Processor Power Connector (or +12V Power 8-pin Connector): Connects to the motherboard to supply 12 V power for higher-power CPUs. Electrically, this is effectively two 4-pin P4 connectors placed side-by-side and combined into a single connector; however, one 2x2 half of the connector is keyed differently than a P4.
  - 4+4-pin A connector that can either act as a 4-pin P4 or 8-pin.
- 4-pin Peripheral Power Connectors (or informally Molex Connectors): These are the other, smaller connectors that go to the various disk drives of the computer. Most of them have four wires: two black, one red, and one yellow. Unlike the US standard mains electrical wire color-coding, each black wire is a ground, the red wire is +5 V, and the yellow wire is +12 V. In some cases these are also used to provide additional power to PCI cards such as FireWire 800 cards.
- Serial ATA (SATA) Power Connector: a 15-pin connector for components that use SATA power plugs. This connector supplies power at three different voltages: +3.3, +5, and +12 V, in three pins per wire, one designed to precharge capacitive loads on for hot-plugging designed backplanes.
- 5-pin Server Signal Connector: For server power supplies, this connector offers SMBus and also remote sensing on 3.3 V & return.
- An IEC 60320 C14 connector with an appropriate C13 cord is used to attach the power supply to the local power grid.
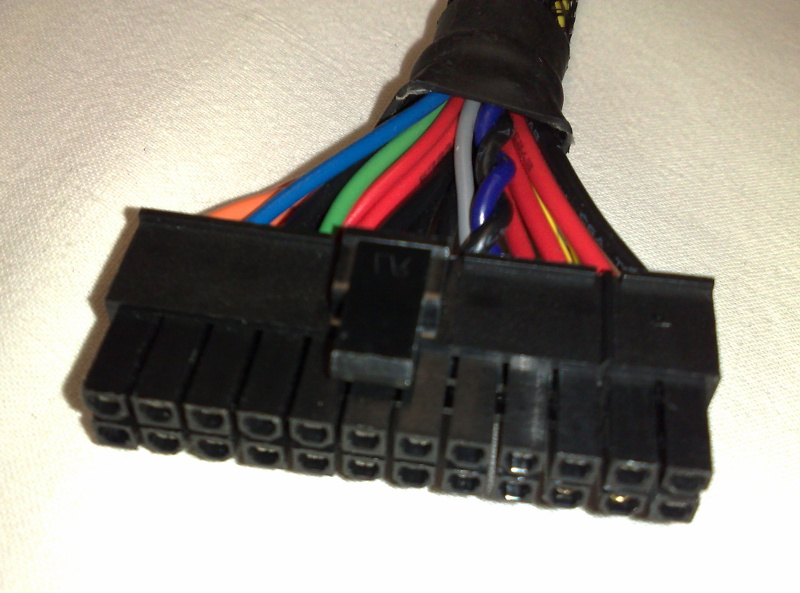
ATX Main Power Connector
(24-pin, in 20+4-pin format)

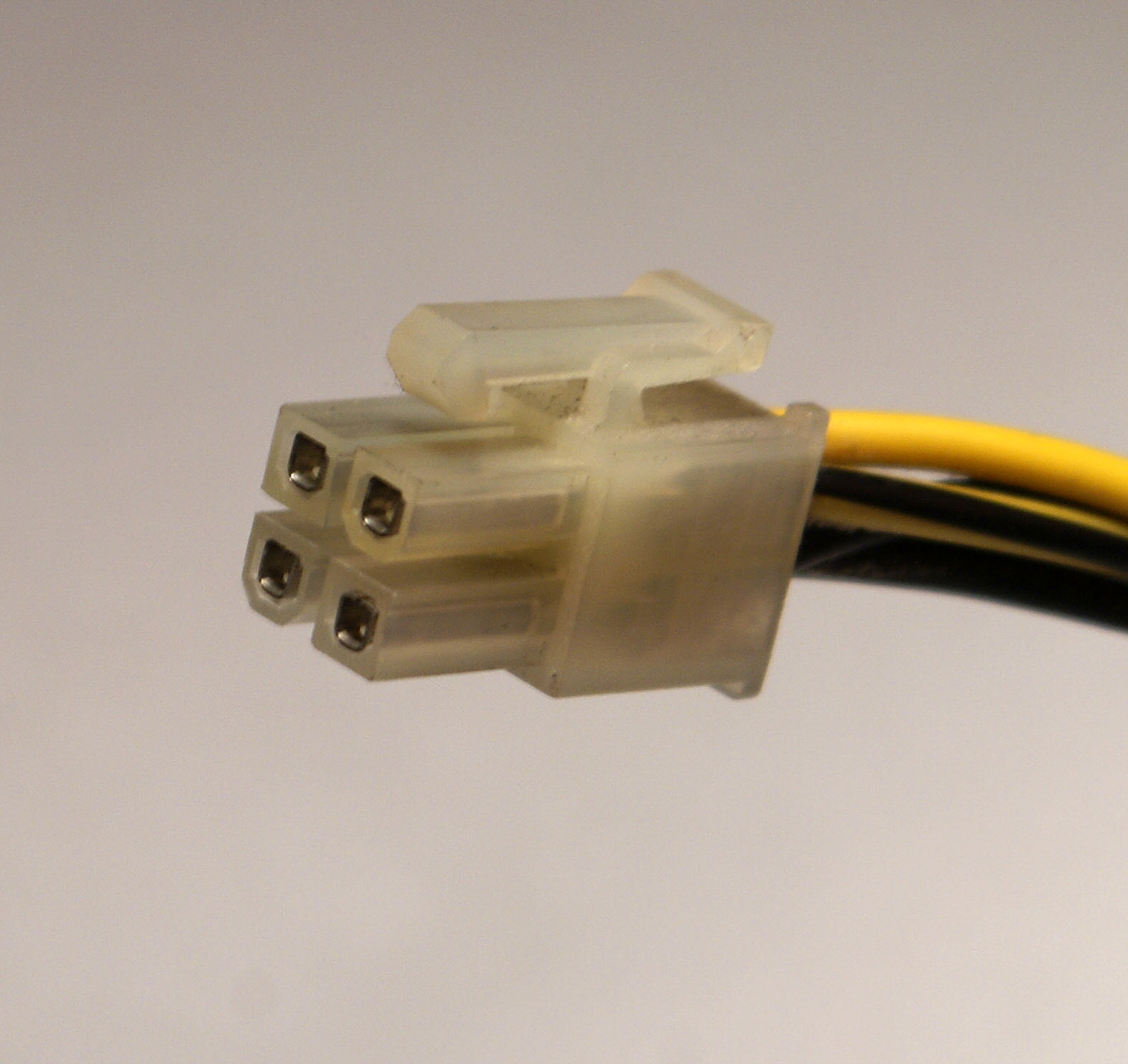
ATX12V power connector /
4-pin EPS12V connector

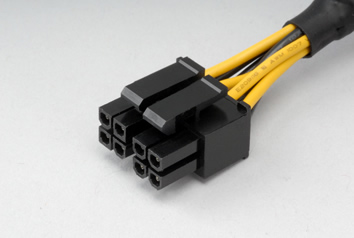
Processor Power Connector /
8-pin EPS12V connector

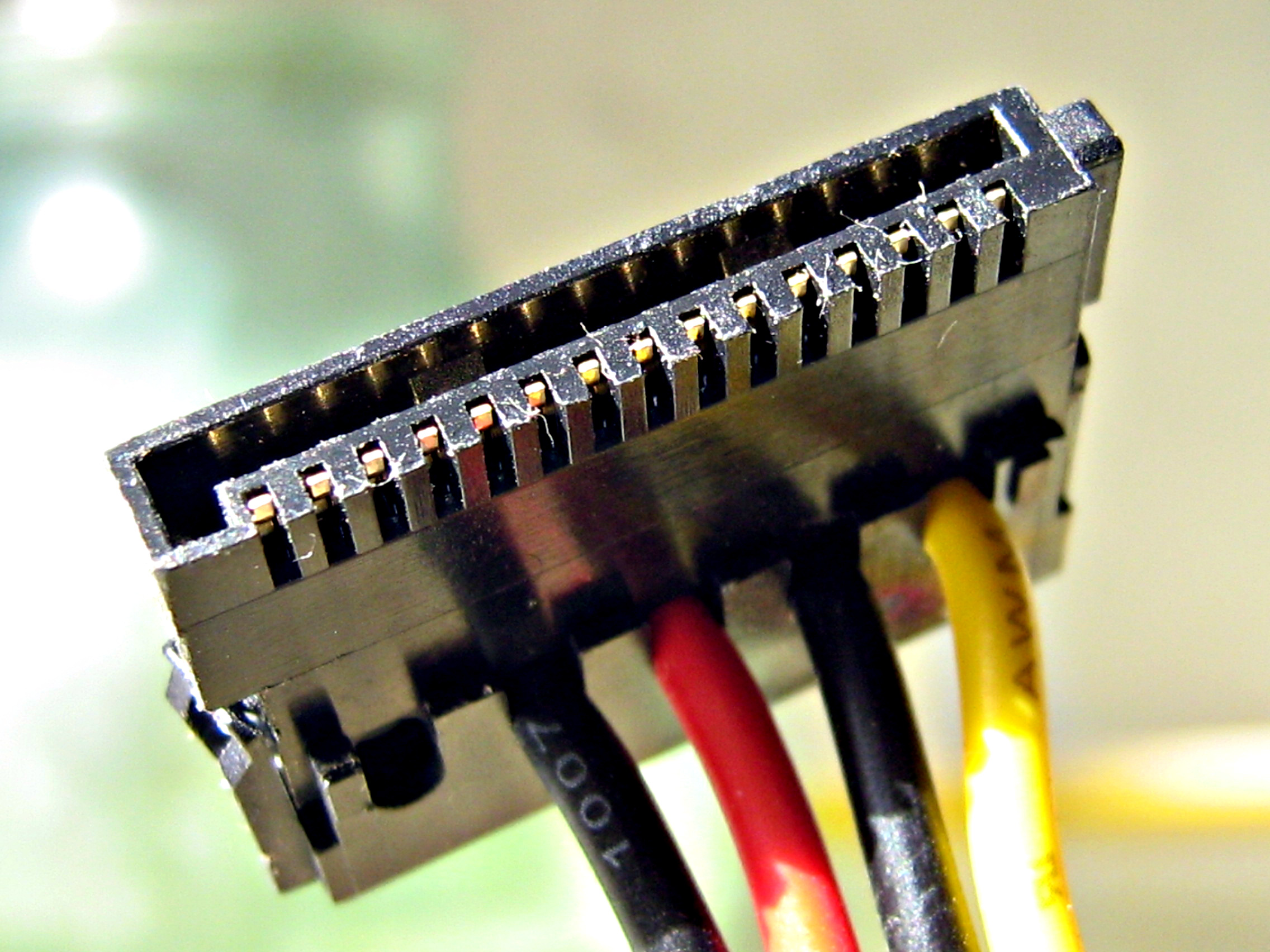
SATA Power Connector
(This example is missing an orange 3.3 V wire running to the connector.)

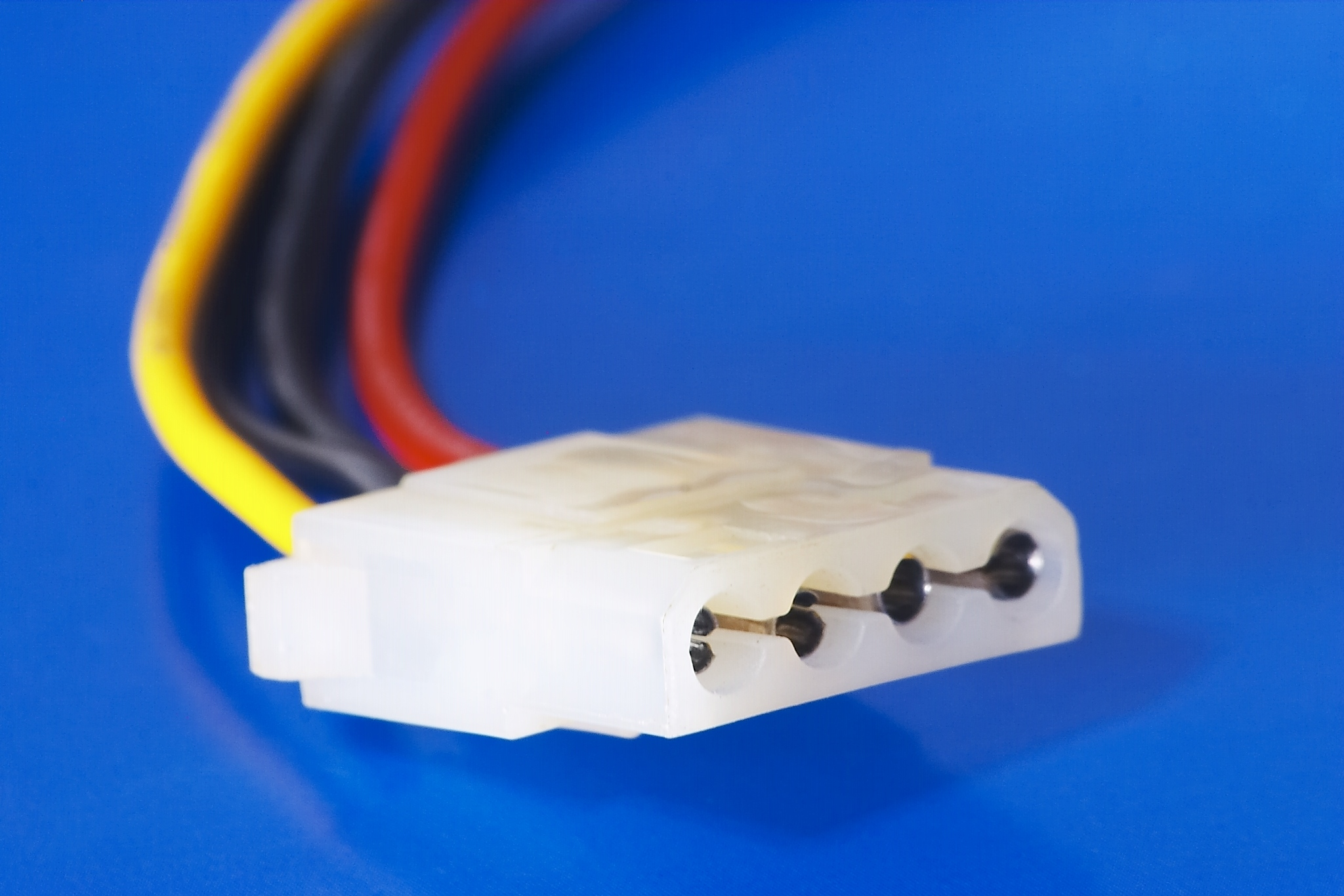
Peripheral Power Connector

==== PCI Express (PCIe) ====
These connectors are used to supply extra power to PCI Express (PCIe) cards for which the power available from a PCIe slot is insufficient. Typically, they're used by PCIe graphics cards. Higher-power cards may have sockets for multiple connectors.

- 6-pin PCIe 2x3 Auxiliary Power Connector: Most modern computer power supplies include six-pin connectors, but a newly introduced eight-pin connector should be seen on the latest model power supplies. Each PCIe 6-pin connector can output a maximum of 75 W.
- 8-pin PCIe 2x4 Auxiliary Power Connector: Provides more power than the 6-pin version. Note: Under no circumstances should it be confused with the 8-pin EPS12V or 4+4-pin connector, which usually supply the CPU with additional power. The assignment of 12V and ground are reversed and lead to a short circuit if the system is started.
  - 6+2-pin: For the purpose of backwards compatibility, some connectors designed for use with high-end PCIe graphics cards feature this kind of pin configuration. It allows either a six-pin card or an eight-pin card to be connected by using two separate connection modules wired into the same sheath: one with six pins and another with two pins. Each PCIe 8-pin connector can output a maximum of 150 W.
- Proprietary NVIDIA 12-pin power plug for Nvidia GeForce RTX 30 series Founders Edition graphics cards. Each 12-pin connector can output a maximum of 648 W (12V, 9A). This connector was primarily connected via the adapter dongles included with these cards, though some dedicated cables were also released. Two 150 W 8-pin connectors can be combined via an adapter cable to form one 648 W 12-pin. This was the predecessor of 12VHPWR.
- Deprecated 16-pin PCIe 12VHPWR Auxiliary Power Connector: Each PCIe 16-pin connector has a specified maximum output of 600 W, with 12 power pins and 4 contact pins. Introduced on ATX 3.0. Sometimes indicated by an "H+" mark on the connector.
- 16-pin PCIe 12V-2x6 Auxiliary Power Connector for PCIe graphics cards. The backward-compatible successor to the 16-pin 12VHPWR connector. Intended to be safer than its predecessor. Maximum specified wattage is unchanged. Sometimes indicated by an "H++" mark on the connector.
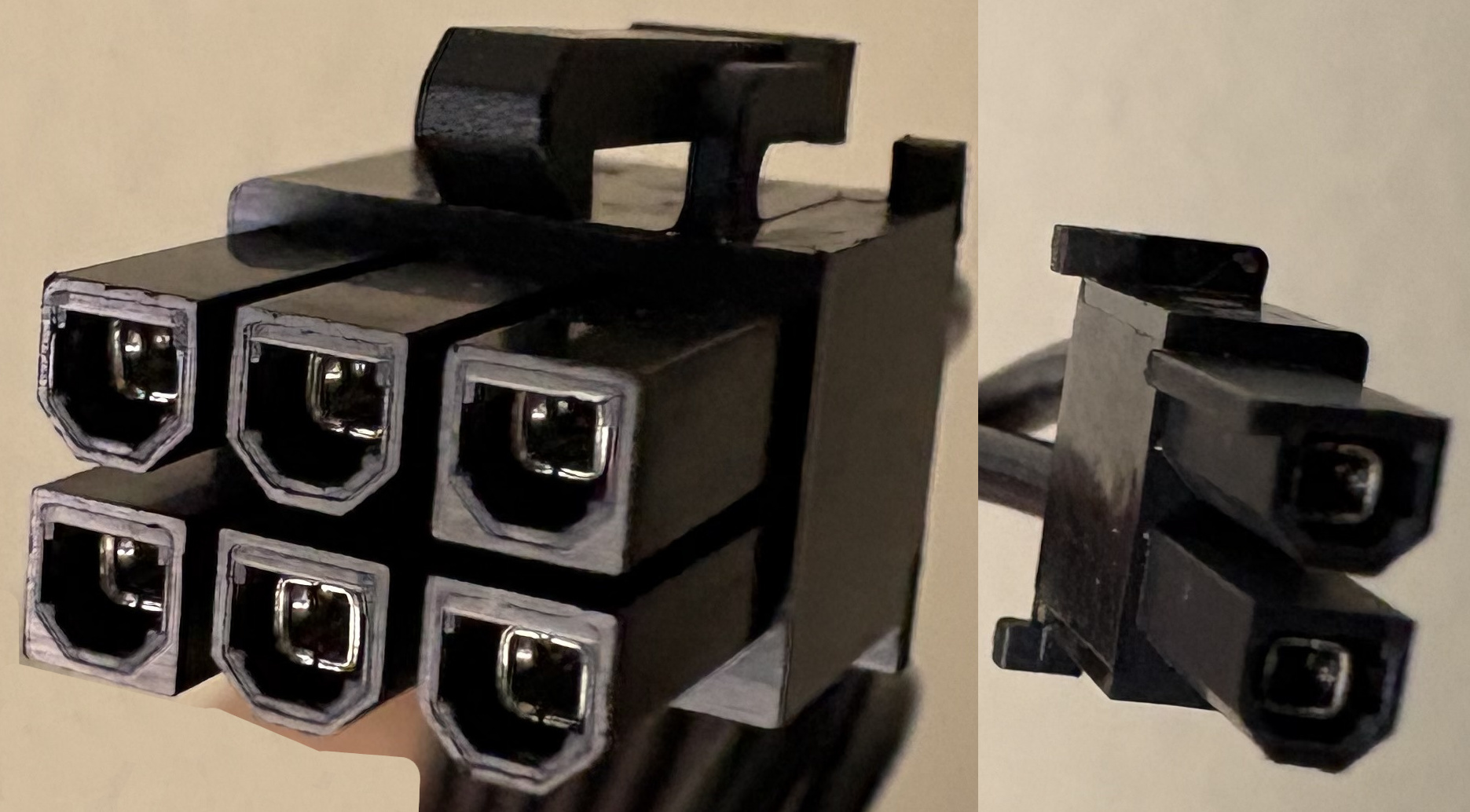
6+2-pin connector (usable as either PCIe 2x3 or 2x4 Auxiliary Power Connector)

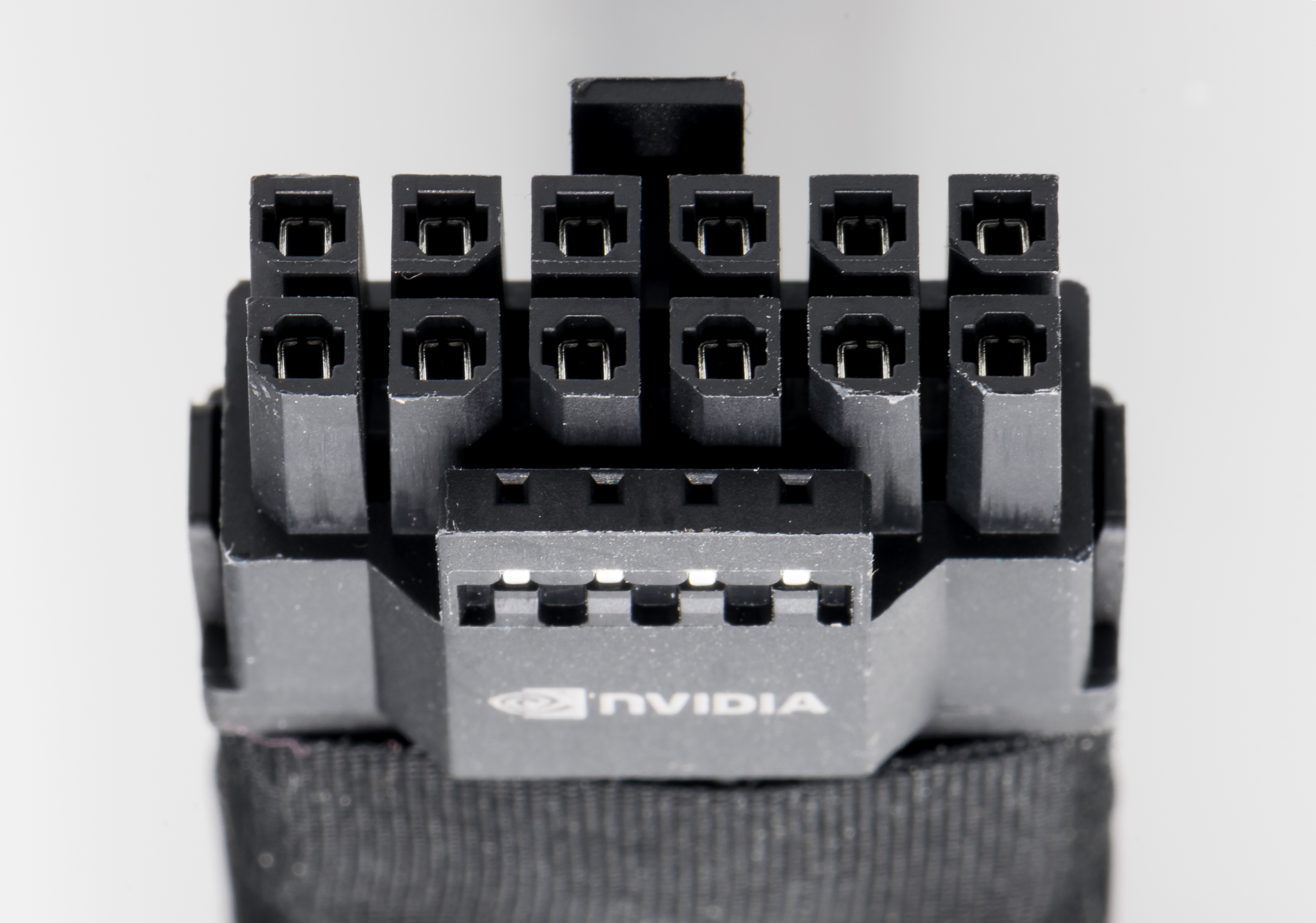
12VHPWR / 12V-2x6 connector

==== Obsolete ====
- Floppy Drive Connector (also Berg connector, Mini-connector, mini-Molex, or 4-pin Molex (Japan) Ltd power connector): This is one of the smallest connectors that supplies a 3.5-inch floppy drive with power. In some cases, it can be used as an auxiliary connector for Accelerated Graphics Port (AGP) video cards. Its cable configuration is similar to the Peripheral connector. In July 2012, revision 1.3 of the Power Supply Design Guide for Desktop Platform Form Factors made inclusion of this connector optional. As of June 2018, ATX12V version 2.52 stated that this connector should not be included and marked its section as "For Historical Reference Only".
- 6-pin Aux Power Connector: This is a keyed 1x6 connector from Molex that provides auxiliary 3.3 V and +5 V power. Introduced in version 2.02 of the ATX Specification, it was "recommended for "motherboards requiring 3.3 V current over 18 A or +5 V current over 30 A". Circa 2004, the ATX12V Design Guide Version 2.0 removed the recommendation to include this connector.
- 6-pin 2x3 Optional Power Connector: Introduced in version 2.0 of the ATX Specification, this connector offered both monitoring and voltage-based control of the PSU's fan speed by the motherboard, a "remote 3.3 V sense line", and a separate power rail for IEEE 1394 ports. In June 2004, ATX12V version 2.01 stated that all details of this connector "are omitted from this design guide until such time as the signals on that connector are more rigidly defined"; subsequent ATX12V design guides never referenced this connector again.
- 6-pin Workstation Power Connector: This is a keyed 2x3 connector, defined by the EPS12V specification, which provides additional 3.3 V & 12 V power to the motherboard for higher-wattage, workstation-class graphics cards. Circa 2004, the later version 2.91 of the specification no longer mentions this connector; instead, that version references the distinct PCIe 2x3 Auxiliary Power Connector as a "Workstation Power Connector for High Power Graphics Cards".
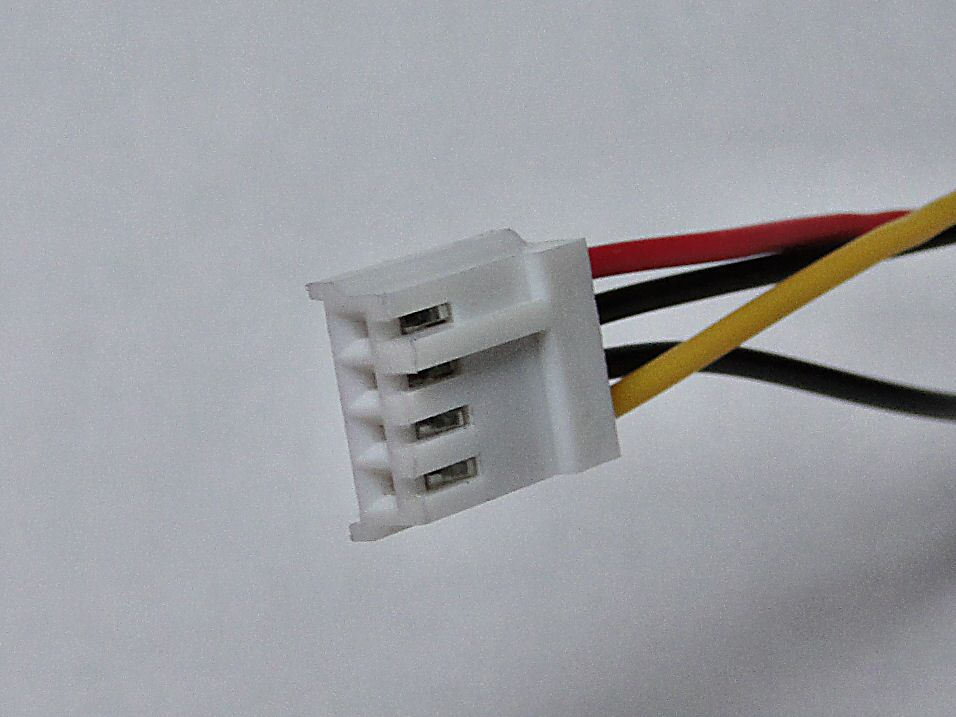
Floppy Drive Connector

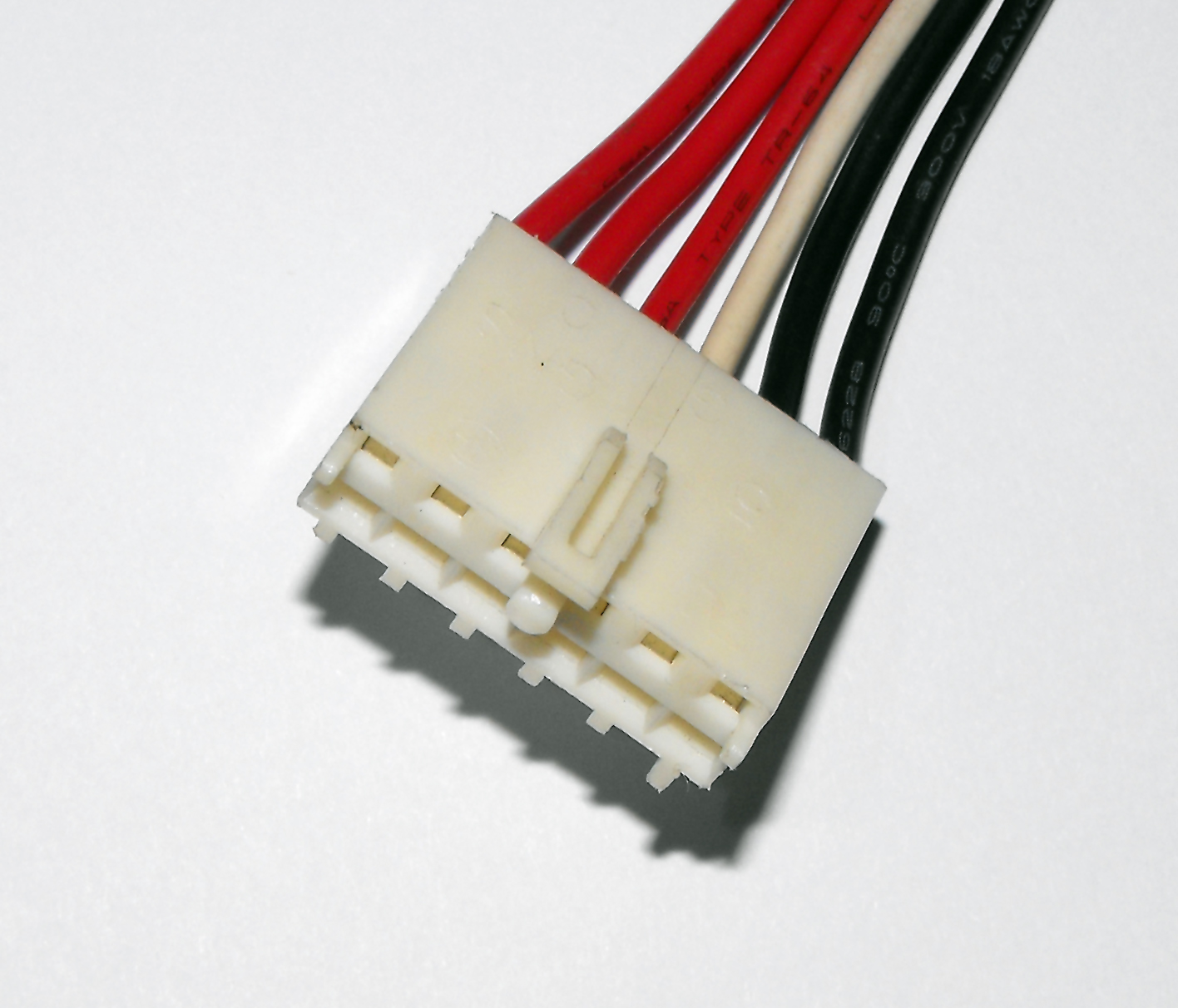
Optional Power Connector

=== Modular power supplies ===
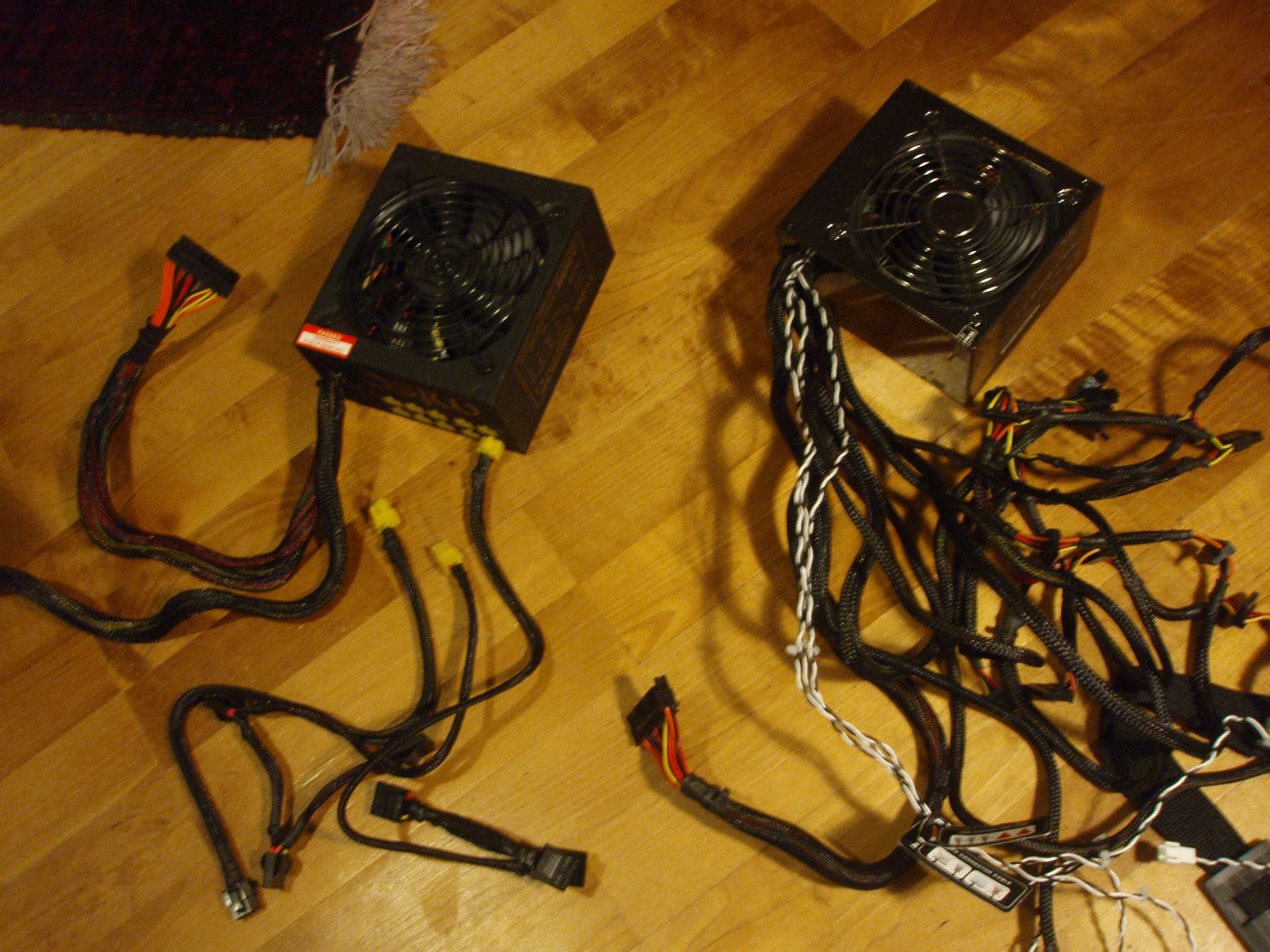
A semi modular power supply to the left and a non-modular power supply to the right

A modular power supply provides a detachable cable system, offering the ability to remove unused connections at the expense of a small amount of extra electrical resistance introduced by the additional connector. This reduces clutter, removes the risk of dangling cables interfering with other components, and can improve case airflow. Many semi modular supplies have some permanent multi-wire cables with connectors at the ends, such as ATX motherboard and 8-pin EPS, though newer supplies marketed as "fully modular" allow even these to be disconnected. The pin assignment of the detachable cables is only standardized on the output end and not on the end that is to be connected to the power supply. Thus, the cables of a modular power supply must only be used with this particular modular power supply model. Usage with another modular power supply, even if the cable prima facie appear compatible, might result in a wrong pin assignment and thus can lead to damage of connected components by supplying 12V to a 5V or 3.3V pin.

== Other form factors ==
=== Box size variations (keeping the ATX connectors) ===
The Small Form Factor with a 12 V connector (SFX12V) configuration has been optimized for small form factor (SFF) system layouts such as microATX. The low profile of the power supply fits easily into these systems. The SFX-L configuration is a minor variation of SFX12V that solely increases the allowed depth by 30% (to 1 cm shallower than the maximum of regular ATX12V).

The Thin Form Factor with a 12 V connector (TFX12V) configuration has been optimized for small and low profile Mini ITX and Mini DTX system layouts. The long narrow profile of the power supply fits easily into low profile systems. The cooling fan placement can be used to efficiently exhaust air from the processor and core area of the motherboard, making possible smaller, more efficient systems using common industry components.

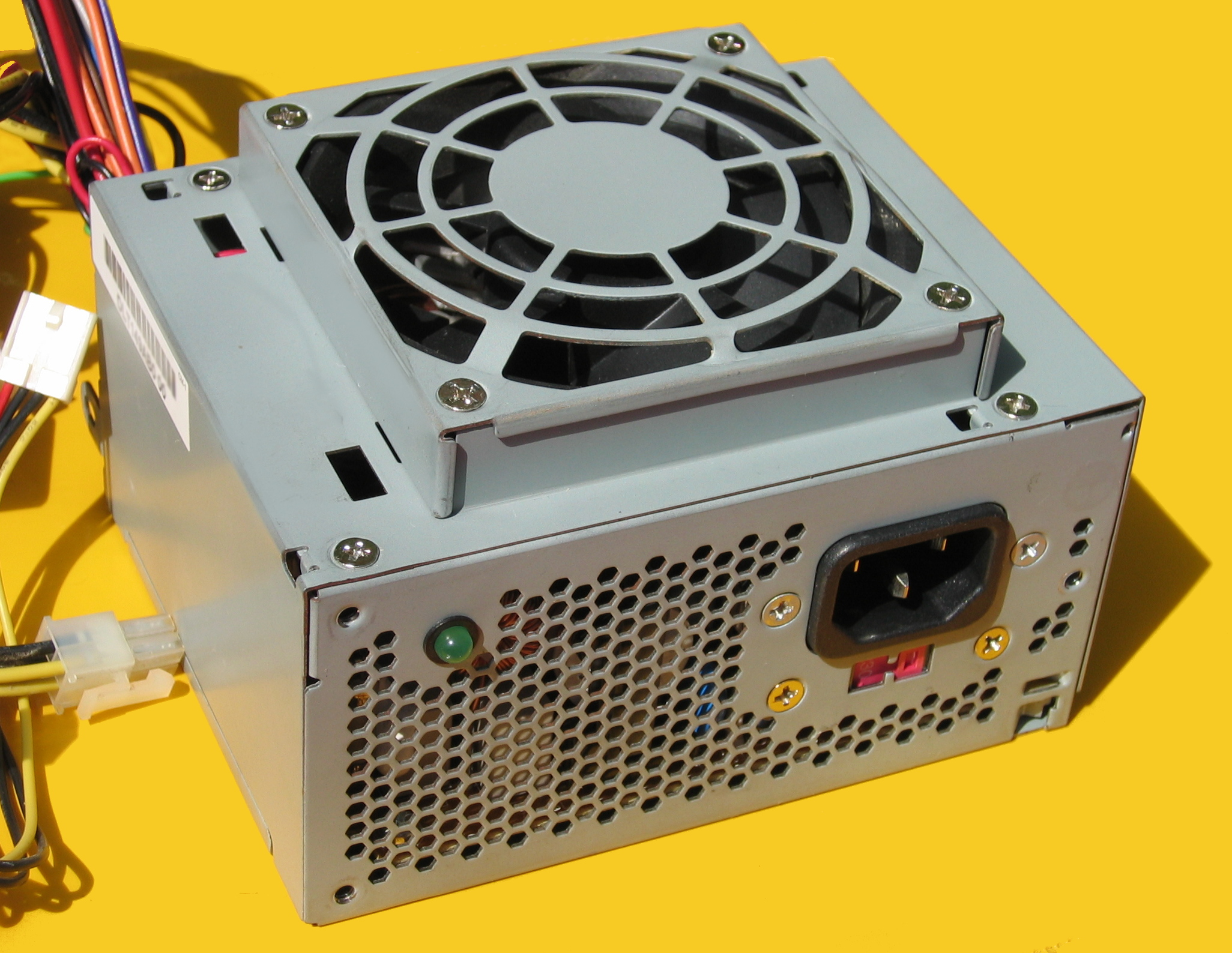
An SFX form factor PSU

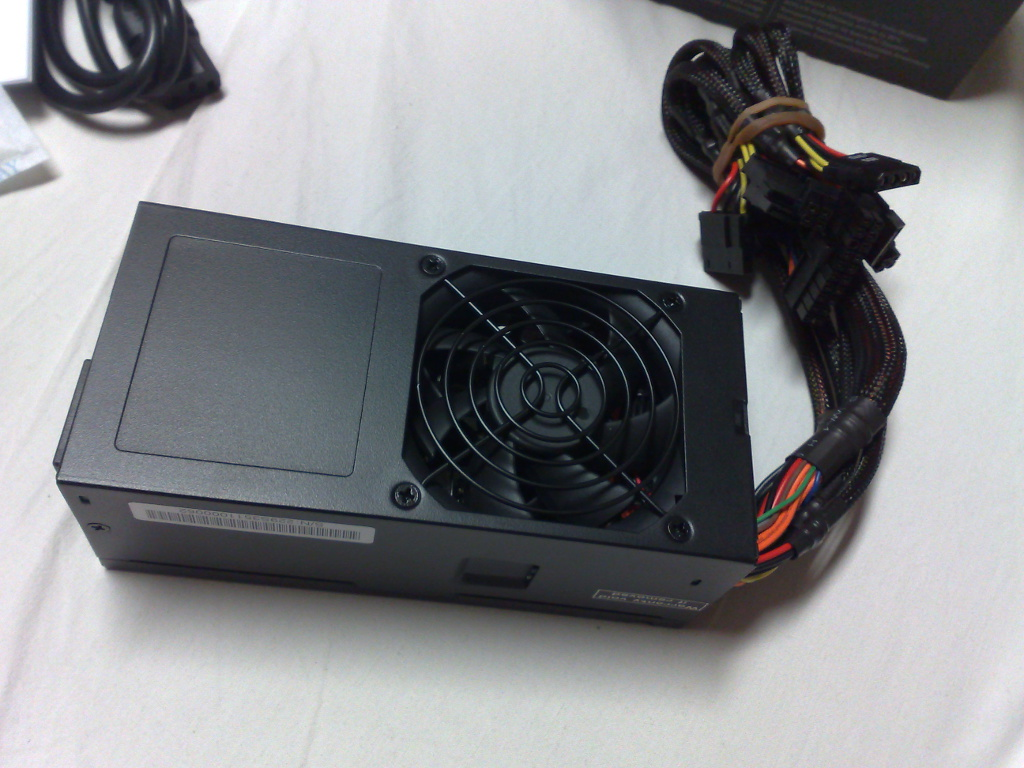
A TFX form factor PSU

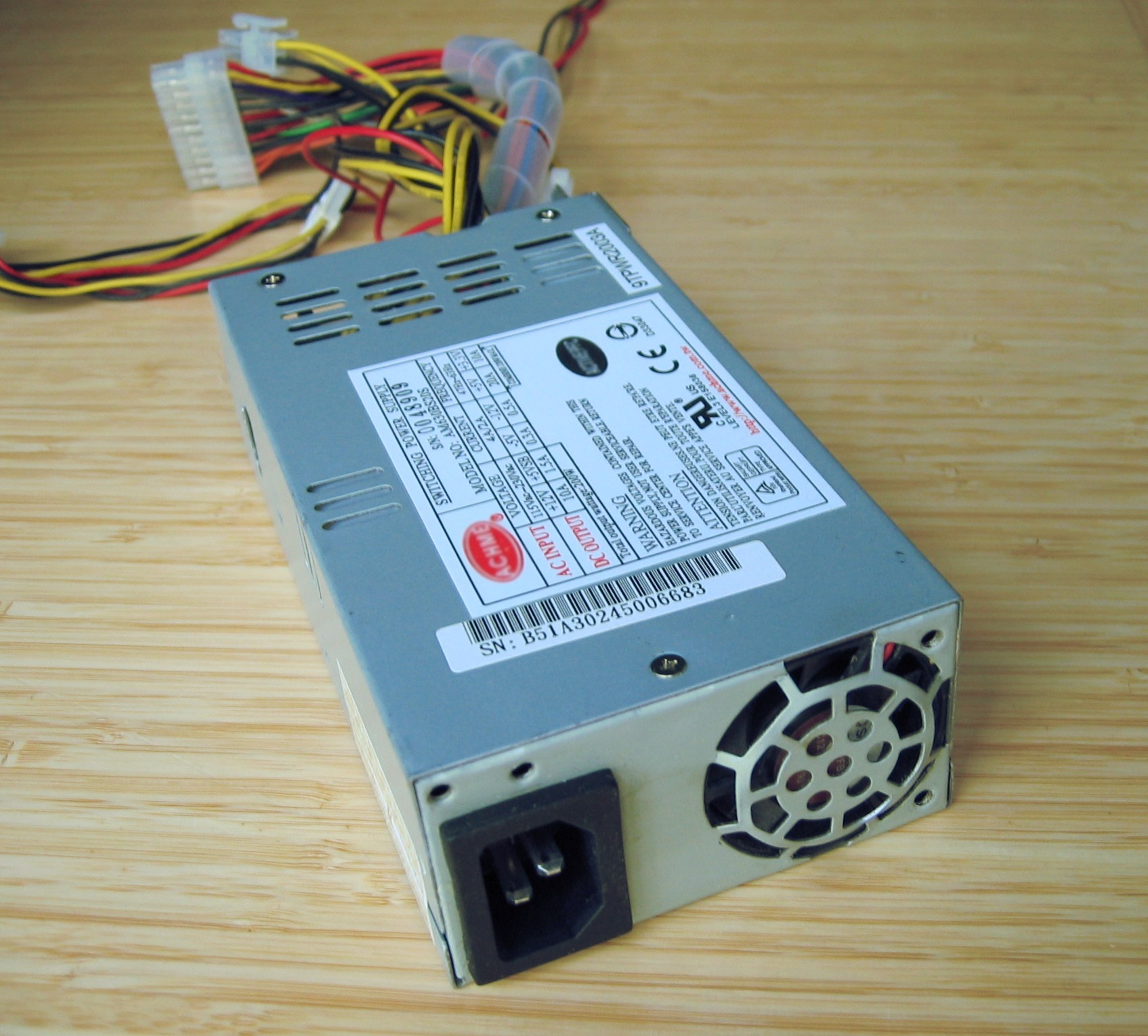
A FlexATX form factor PSU

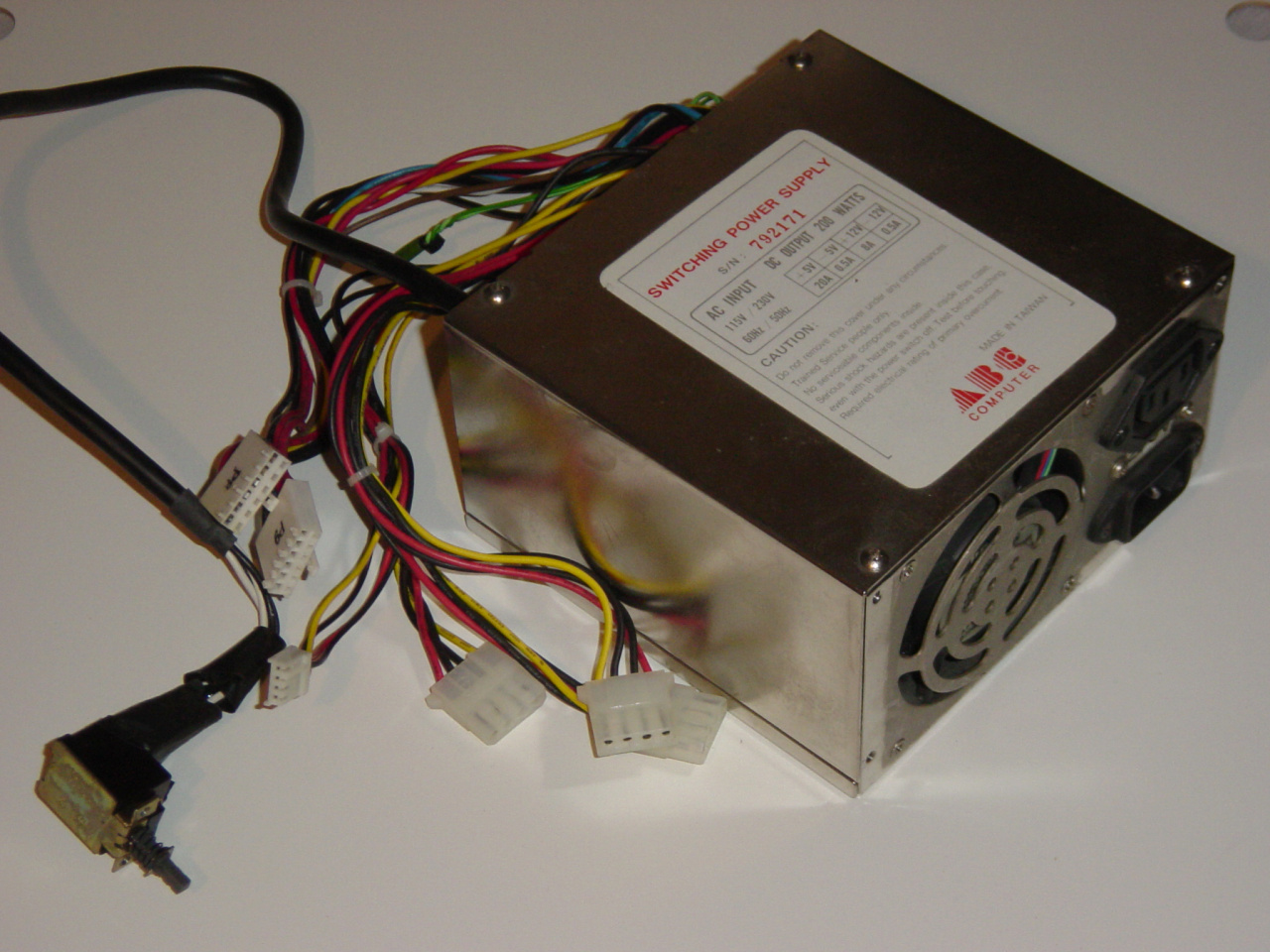
A formerly used AT PSU, mechanically of the same size as the ATX PSUs

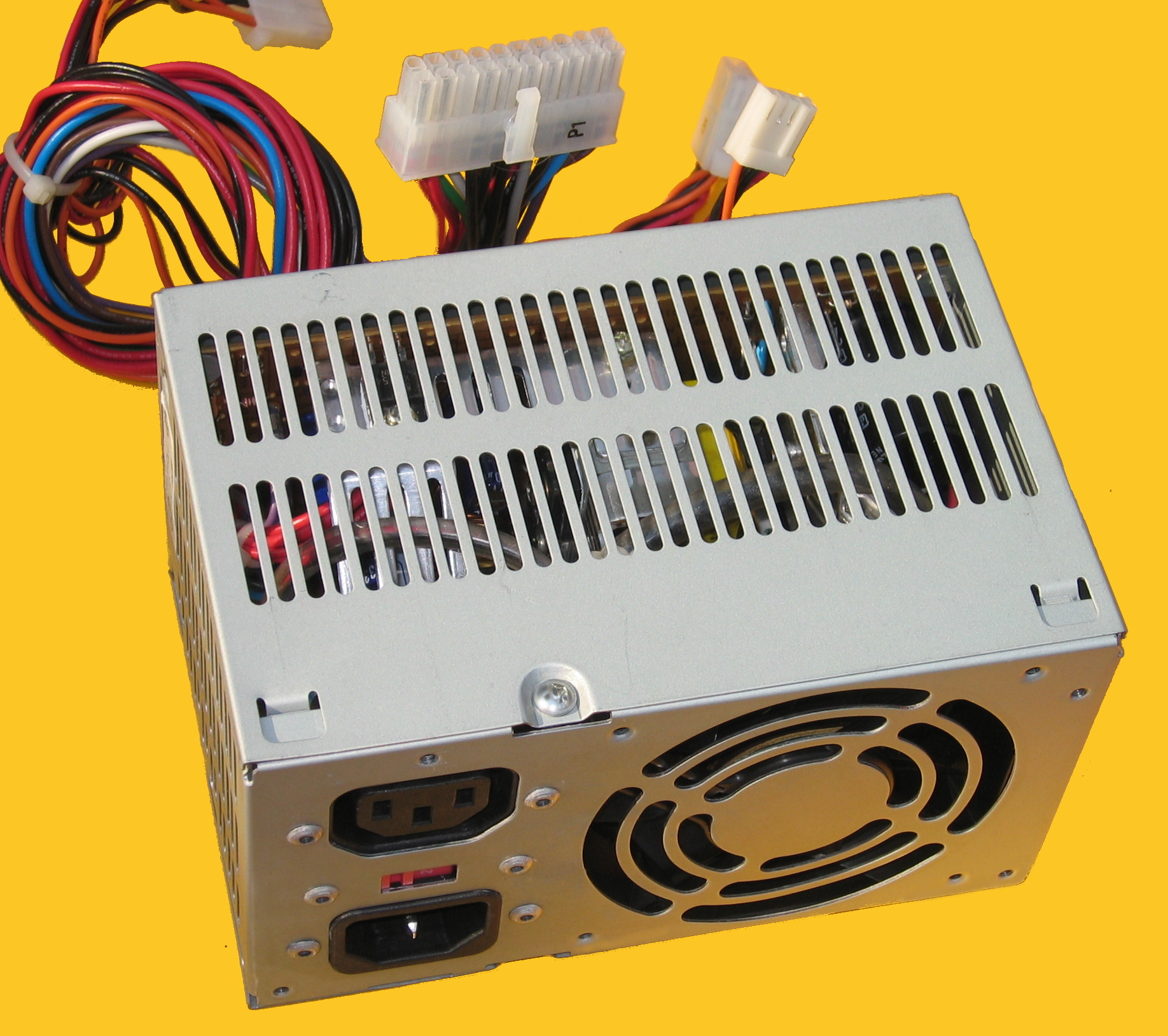
PS3 power supply, shorter than ATX, only, 300 W maximum (not to be confused with the PlayStation 3)

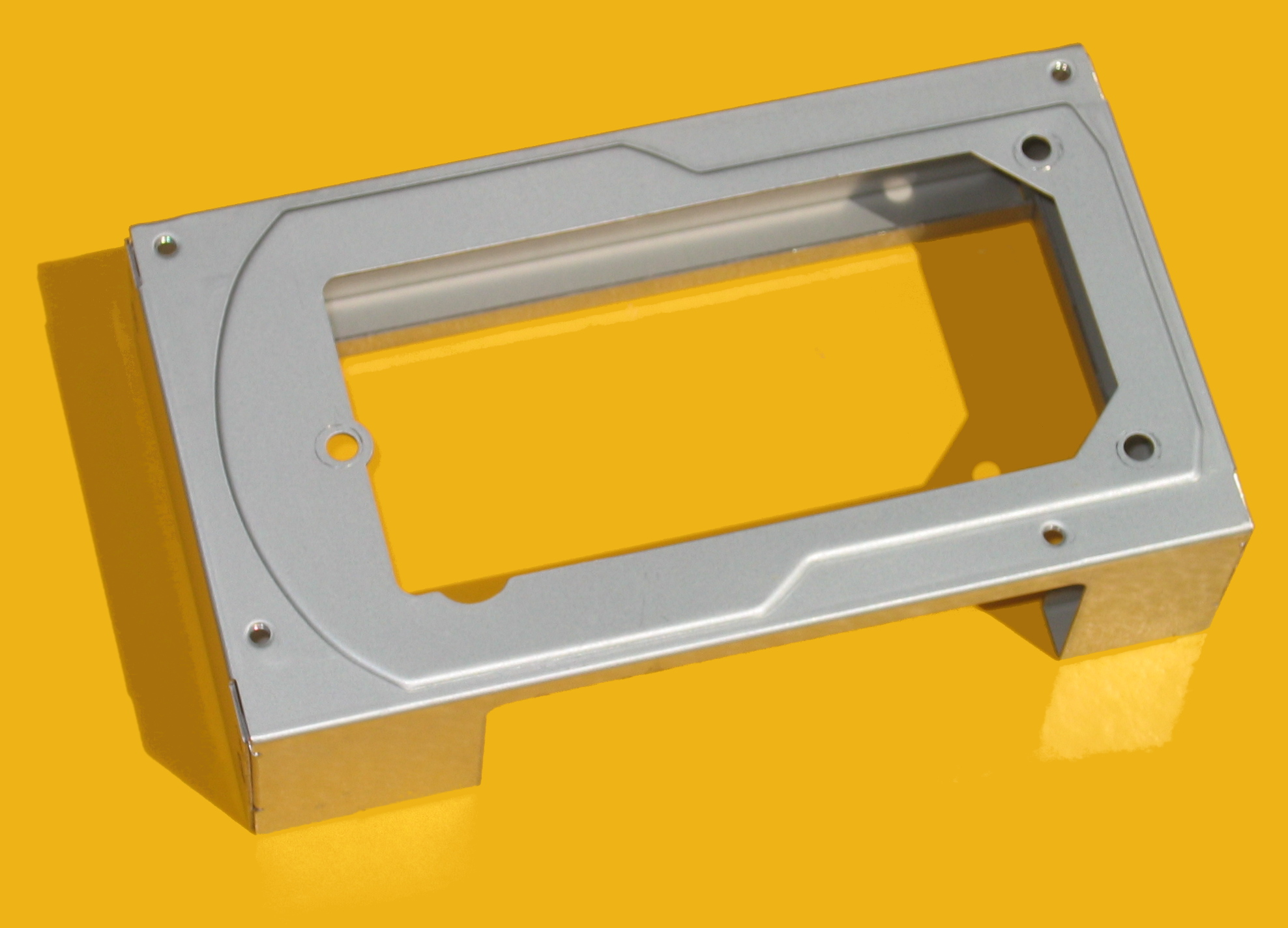
An adapter allowing an SFX PSU to substitute an ATX or PS3 PSU

=== Portable computer ===
Most portable computers have power supplies that provide 25 to 200 W. In portable computers (such as laptops) there is usually an external power supply (sometimes referred to as a "power brick" due to its similarity, in size, shape and weight, to a real brick) which converts AC power to one DC voltage (most commonly 19 V), and further DC-DC conversion occurs within the laptop to supply the various DC voltages required by the other components of the portable computer.

External power supply could send data about itself (power, current and voltage ratings) to the computer. For example, genuine Dell power source uses 1-Wire protocol to send data by third wire to the laptop. The laptop then refuses a non-matching adapter.

=== Redundant ===
Rack mount servers may utilize redundant power supply based on edge connector ("slot") connections that allow them to be inserted or removed without shutting down the system. Most systems use two PSUs fed from two different sources of external power. The two PSUs may share the load, or one may stay in standby leaving the other to generate most of the DC power.

There used to be no standard for redundant PSUs, with manufacturers each specifying their own standard, e.g. the Common Slot Power Supply (CSPS) used by Hewlett-Packard and Huawei servers. Some time before 2012, Intel defined a Common Redundant Power Supply (CRPS) standard and shared it with other PSU and server hardware manufacturers. Intel later contributed this standard to the Open Compute Project as the Modular Hardware System - Common Redundant Power Supply (M-CRPS) base specification, first publicly released in 2022 as version 0.70, under a CC BY license.

PSUs compliant with M-CRPS version 1.05.00 RC5 are backwards compatible with systems using "Legacy CRPS". "Legacy CRPS" PSUs cannot be inserted into M-CRPS systems due to physical keying (no forward compatibility). They would be compatible if not for (1) different voltage set-points interfering with load balancing (2) overly "strong" pull-up resistors on A0 and A1 pins.

== Life span ==
Life span is usually specified in mean time between failures (MTBF), where higher MTBF ratings indicate longer device life and better reliability. Using higher quality electrical components at less than their maximum ratings or providing better cooling can contribute to a higher MTBF rating because lower stress and lower operating temperatures decrease component failure rates.

An estimated MTBF value of 100,000 hours (roughly, 140 months) at 25 °C and under full load is fairly common. Such a rating expects that, under the described conditions, 77% of the PSUs will be operating failure-free over three years (36 months); equivalently, 23% of the units are expected to fail within three years of operation. For the same example, only 37% of the units (fewer than a half) are expected to last 100,000 hours without failing. (Note: This figure assumes that the PSUs have not reached the higher failure rate portion of the bathtub curve.) The formula for calculating predicted reliability, R(t), is

$R(t) = e^{-\frac{t}{t_{MTBF}}}$

where t is the time of operation in the same time units as the MTBF specification, e is the mathematical constant approximately equal to 2.71828, and t_{MTBF} is the MTBF value as specified by a manufacturer.

Power supplies for servers, industrial control equipment, or other places where reliability is important may be hot swappable, and may incorporate N+1 redundancy and uninterruptible power supply; if N power supplies are required to meet the load requirement, one extra is installed to provide redundancy and allow for a faulty power supply to be replaced without downtimes.

== Wiring diagrams ==
Pinouts of ATX 2.x motherboard power connectors, 24-pin (top) and four-pin "P4" (bottom), as viewed into mating side of the plugs

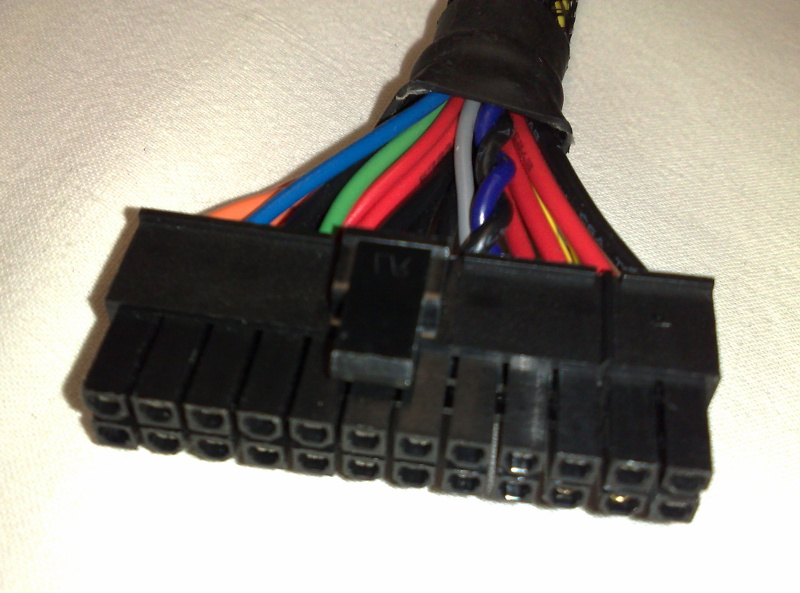
24-pin ATX motherboard power plug; pins 11, 12, 23 and 24 form a detachable separate four-pin plug, making it backward compatible with 20-pin ATX receptacles

AT power connector (on older, AT motherboards)
Color	Pin	Signal
Orange	P8.1	Power good
Red	P8.2	+5 V
Yellow	P8.3	+12 V
Blue	P8.4	−12 V
Black	P8.5	Ground
Black	P8.6	Ground
Black	P9.1	Ground
Black	P9.2	Ground
White	P9.3	−5 V
Red	P9.4	+5 V
Red	P9.5	+5 V
Red	P9.6	+5 V

24-pin ATX12V 2.x power supply connector
Color	Signal (Note: Light-blue background denotes control signals.)	Pin (Note: Light-green background denotes the pins present only in the 24-pin connector.)	Pin (Note: In the 20-pin connector, pins 13–22 are numbered 11–20 respectively.)	Signal	Color
Orange	+3.3 V	1	13	+3.3 V	Orange
Orange	+3.3 V	1	13	+3.3 V sense (Note: Supplies +3.3 V power and also has a second low-current wire for remote sensing.)	Brown
Orange	+3.3 V	2	14	−12 V	Blue
Black	Ground	3	15	Ground	Black
Red	+5 V	4	16	Power on (Note: A control signal that is pulled up to +5 V by the PSU and must be driven low to turn on the PSU.)	Green
Black	Ground	5	17	Ground	Black
Red	+5 V	6	18	Ground	Black
Black	Ground	7	19	Ground	Black
Grey	Power good (Note: A control signal that is low when other outputs have not yet reached, or are about to leave, correct voltages.)	8	20	Reserved (Note: Formerly −5 V ( white wire), absent in modern power supplies; it was optional in ATX and ATX12V v1.2 and deleted since v1.3.)	None
Purple	+5 V standby	9	21	+5 V	Red
Yellow	+12 V	10	22	+5 V	Red
Yellow	+12 V	11	23	+5 V	Red
Orange	+3.3 V	12	24	Ground	Black

ATX12VO power supply connector
Color	Signal	Pin	Pin	Signal	Color
Green	PS_ON#	1	6	PWR_OK	Gray
Black	COM	2	7	+12 VSB	Purple
Black	COM	3	8	+12 V1 DC	Yellow
Black	COM	4	9	+12 V1 DC	Yellow
TBD	Reserved	5	10	+12 V1 DC; Voltage Sensing Pin	Yellow

== Testing ==
A 'power supply tester' is a tool used to test the functionality of a computer's power supply. Testers can confirm the presence of the correct voltages at each power supply connector. Testing under load is recommended for the most accurate readings.

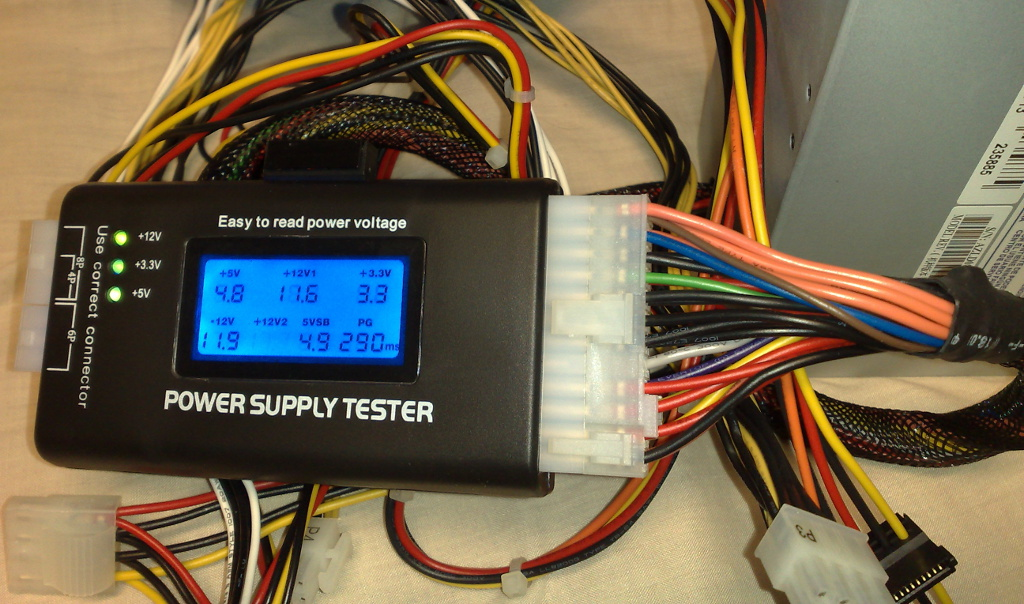
ATX PSU tester with an LCD

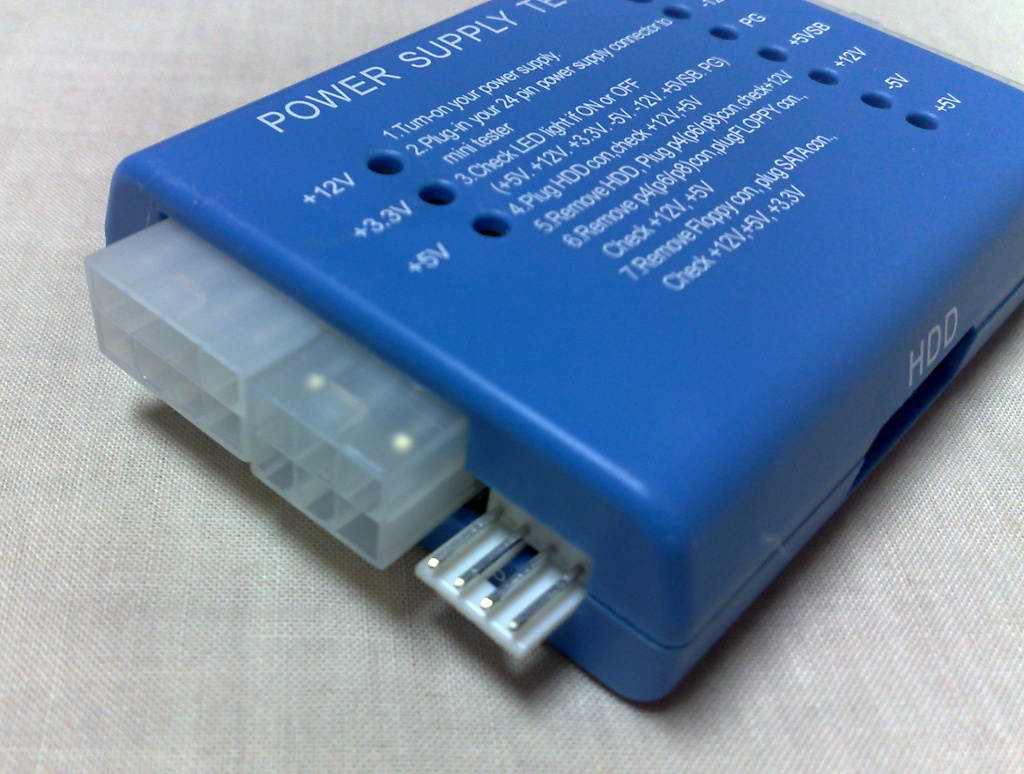
ATX PSU tester with LED indicators

Ripple tests are performed with an external load and monitoring equipment.

== Monitoring ==
The voltage of the PSU can be monitored by the system monitor of most modern motherboards. This can often be done through a section within the BIOS, or, once an operating system is running, through a system monitor software like lm_sensors on Linux, envstat on NetBSD, sysctl hw.sensors on OpenBSD and DragonFly BSD, or SpeedFan on Windows.

Most power supply fans are not connected to the speed sensor on the motherboard and so cannot be monitored, but some high-end PSUs can provide digital control and monitoring, which requires a connection to the fan-speed sensor or USB port on the motherboard.

== See also ==
- IEC 62700 (DC power supply for notebook computers)
- List of computer power supply manufacturers
- Power management
- Quiet PC
- Switched-mode power supply applications
- PS-ON Signal
