= PS-ON Signal =

Type of power connector

#PS_ON pin is marked by number 16.

PS-ON Signal is a pin on a 20-pin or 24-pin ATX-specified power connector used to turn a personal computer power supply unit on/off. The PS_ON pin is normally pulled high in an open-circuit, but will turn on the power supply when it is pulled low, by shorting it to the GND (COM) terminal. Conversely the power supply is turned off when the PS-ON is in open-circuit.

The PS_ON pin can be jumpered to manually turn a PSU on.
