= Outline of computers =

Overview of and topical guide to computers

The following outline is provided as an overview of and topical guide to computers:

Computers – programmable machines designed to automatically carry out sequences of arithmetic or logical operations. The sequences of operations can be changed readily, allowing computers to solve more than one kind of problem.

== What type of thing is a computer? ==
Computers can be described as all of the following:

- Tools –
  - Machines –
    - Business machines –
- Systems –

== Types of computers ==
- Mainframe computer –
  - Super computer –
- Midrange computer –
- Personal computer –
  - Desktop computer –
  - Microcomputer –
- Mobile computer and mobile device –
  - Smartphone –
  - Tablet computer –
  - Laptop –
- Computer appliance –
  - Business machine –
- Information appliance –
  - Smartphone –
  - Smart TV –

== Computer architecture ==
Computer architecture –

=== Computer components ===
- Motherboard –
- Processor –
  - Graphics processor –
  - RAM –
- ROM –
  - Floppy disk –
  - Hard drive –
- Input devices –
  - Keyboard –
    - Keyboard technology –
    - Projection keyboard –
    - Roll-up keyboard
    - Virtual keyboard –
    - Wireless keyboard –
  - Mouse –

=== Computer memory ===
Computer memory

- 1-2-AX working memory task
- AGP Inline Memory Module
- Aperture (computer memory)
- Associative memory
  - Autoassociative memory
    - Bidirectional associative memory
  - Hopfield network
- Bubble memory
- Buddy memory allocation
- Cache-only memory architecture
- Cellular Memory Modules
- Channel memory
- Common Flash Memory Interface
- Comparison of memory cards
- Computing with Memory
- Content-addressable memory
- Conventional memory
- Core rope memory
- DOS memory management
- Declarative memory
- Delay line memory
- Deterministic memory
- Direct memory access
- Distributed memory
- Distributed shared memory
- Drum memory
- Dynamic memory allocation
- Dynamic random-access memory
- Dynamic video memory technology
- ECC memory
- Environmental memory
- EOS memory
- Expanded memory
- Extended memory
- External Memory Interface
- Fiscal memory devices
- Flash memory
- Flash memory controller
- Flat memory model
- Genetic memory (computer science)
- Unbuffered memory
- Uniform Memory Access
- Universal memory
- Upper memory area
- Video memory
- Virtual memory
- Volatile memory

== Computer performance ==
- Computer performance by orders of magnitude

== Computing ==
See: Outline of computing

== Computer science ==
See: Outline of computer science

== History of computers ==
History of computing hardware

- Analog computers
- History of computer components
  - Punched cards
  - History of general purpose CPUs
  - History of the floppy disk
- History of personal computers

== Computers and culture ==
- Social media
  - memes

== Computer industry ==
=== Computer manufacturing ===
- List of computer hardware manufacturers
- Hewlett-Packard
- Toshiba
- Dell
- Apple
- Acer
- Asus

=== Computer engineering ===
See: Outline of computer engineering

=== Software industry ===
- Personal computers
  - Microsoft
  - Apple
  - Linux
- Business computers
  - IBM
  - Oracle
- Internet
  - Google
  - Facebook
  - Yahoo!
  - AOL
  - eBay
  - PayPal

==== Software development ====
Software development –

- List of software development philosophies
- Programming language

==== Software engineering ====
See: Outline of software engineering

== Computer organizations ==
- Users' group (list)

== Computer publications ==
Computer magazines – See List of computer magazines
Online –

- CNET
  - ZDNet
- Wired.com
  - Wired.co.uk
- Huffington Post
  - Techcrunch
  - Engadget
- News Corp
  - All things D

== Persons influential in computers ==
- List of pioneers in computer science
- Charles Babbage
- Alan Turing
- Grace Hopper
- Thomas J. Watson
- Thomas Watson, Jr.
- Bill Gates
- Paul Allen
- Steve Jobs
- Steve Wozniak
- Robert Noyce
- Andrew Grove
- Linus Torvalds

== See also ==
- Outline of computer engineering
- Outline of computer programming
- Outline of computer science
- Outline of computer security
- Outline of computer vision
- Outline of computing
