= Power over =

Power over may refer to various forms of powering devices over data links:

- Power over eSATA (eSATAp), a variant of eSATA also delivering power over the same cable (but not the same wires inside the cable)
- Power over Ethernet (PoE), a method to power devices over their Ethernet cable (shared wires for data and power)
- Power over fiber (PoF), delivering power over optical (data) links (shared fibers for data and power)
- Power over LAN, a PoE-predecessor originally by PowerDsine, now Microsemi (shared wires for data and power)

== See also ==
- 1-Wire, an electrical interface for power and data transmission over two wires
- Phantom power, shared wires for analog electrical signals and power
- Power-line communication (PLC), data transmission over mains power supply
- PoweredUSB, a proprietary high power delivering variant of USB
- USB Power Delivery Specification (USB PD), high power delivery over (standard) USB
- Wireless power transfer (WPT), energy transmission via magnetic fields or electromagnetic waves
- Overpower
