= Model 4 =

Model 4 may refer to:

- the TRS-80 Model 4, a computer
- the Convair Model 4, an airplane
- the IBM Printer Model 4
