= IBM Printer Model 4 =

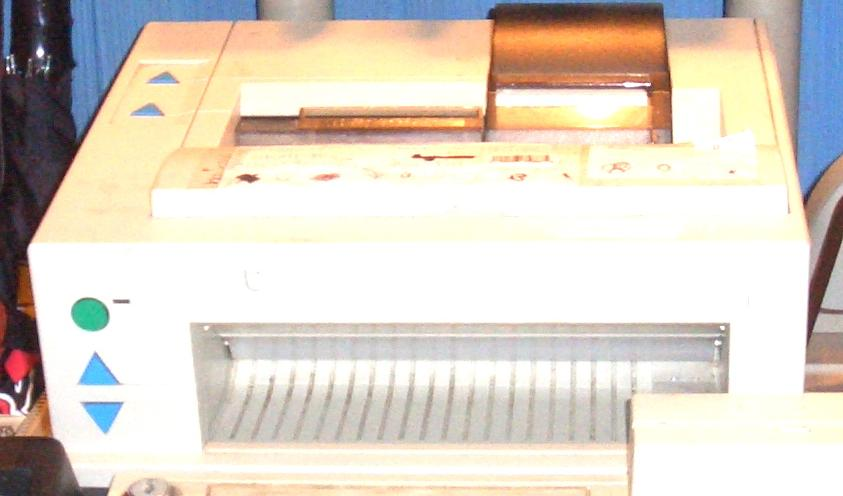
- Also known as: IBM 4694 printer; Part Number: 93F0463
- Manufacturer: IBM
- Released: 1991
- Discontinued: 2005
- Predecessor: IBM Printer Model 3
- Successor: IBM 4610
- Related: IBM 4694

The IBM Printer Model 4 was a dot-matrix point-of-sale printer launched in 1991. It was the direct relative and homophone of the IBM Printer Model 3. It and its successor, the IBM 4610, nowadays, it's really few still in use by retailers. The printer was discontinued in 2005.

== History ==
The previous Printer Model 3 was released as part of IBM 4683 POS system equipment line; The Model 4 was a little updated version of Model 3, upgraded to support of new IBM 4694 POS system. However, unlike the Model 2, which could only operate with IBM 4683 POS systems, the Model 3 was compatible with 4694 POS systems. Both the Model 3 and Model 4 printers made the same printing noise since they had the same print engine.

In countries, where cash registers and receipt printers are hardware-fiscalized, fiscal versions were offered, mostly under the name Printer Model 3F. They were essentially Model 4 printers with added regionally-compliant fiscal logic. Both IBM and third-parties produced compliant fiscal logic for fiscalized Model 3F/4 printers. During transition of the industry from dot-matrix to thermal receipt printers, IBM offered 4610 printer models TN3 and TN4 as Model 3F/4 successors for hardware fiscalization, wherever paper journalling continued to be legally practicised before introduction of electronic journalling to the law. Based on dual-station TG3 and TG9 models of 4610 printer respectively, they included an additional thermal printing station specifically for paper journalling.

Preceded by IBM Printer Model 3 (IBM 4683 printer)	IBM Printer Model 4 (IBM 4694 printer)	Succeeded by IBM 4610
