= Fiscalization =

Process designed to avoid retailer fraud

Fiscalization is a system designed to avoid retailer fraud in the retail sector. It involves using special cash registers or software to accurately report sales, helping prevent tax evasion. Fiscalization laws about cash registers have been introduced in various countries to control the grey economy by ensuring that all retail transactions are properly recorded and taxed, thereby reducing the possibility of fraud.

Fiscalization law mostly covers:

- how the electronic cash register should work (functions),
- how the related retail processes should be designed,
- which data should be saved and how,
- which reports for the authorities should be created,
- how and when should reporting be done

Fiscalization is, in many cases, linked to other laws, such as laws related to accounting, taxation, consumer protection, data protection and privacy.

It's common for fiscalization law to be confused with fiscal law. Fiscal law and fiscalization are different things in finance and taxes. Fiscal law is about the rules a government makes for handling its money and taxes. This includes how to collect taxes and manage spending. Fiscalization is more specific, focusing on how to stop tax evasion, especially in retail.

== Basic philosophy ==
In case of fiscalization laws, every government is basically following the same philosophy:

- the tax-related data of every transaction should be stored safely in a manner in which data manipulation is not possible after the transaction is closed
- reporting to the tax authority about stored tax related data should be possible any time and without any data manipulation

Based on this philosophy, different governments are defining different regulations that must be implemented in the different areas of the retailer's environment.

For example, fiscal law in Portugal is specifying that VAT-related data are regularly sent to the authority. Based on the data most implementations are done in the ERP system of the retailer (in the Back Office/Accounting). On the other side countries like Serbia have fiscal laws which force the usage of the fiscal printer. The fiscal printer stores the VAT-related data and sends it to the fiscal authority via an included special network device. This kind of fiscalization is mostly implemented in the cash register application.

In some other countries (e.g. Austria), the transaction data must be signed by a special signature device and the data has to be saved in a special journal database. Typically, these kind of fiscal laws are implemented in the POS application and in the back office.

== History ==
Fiscalization, along with VAT, was introduced to fight against the grey economy. The first country to introduce fiscal law in regards to the use of specific fiscal devices was Italy, and second one was Greece. Italy introduced this fiscal law in 1983. Introducing fiscal law—particularly about cash registers—came from the need to avoid retailer's frauds. According to fiscal law, an appropriate fiscal receipt has to be printed and given to the customer.

== Challenges of modern retailing in the fiscal context ==
Different aspects of fiscalization are creating big challenges

The implementation of national fiscal laws is a complex regulatory process. Within the modern retailing sector, these requirements present specific operational challenges due to the high volume of transactions and diverse tax classifications.

As of today, modern retailing means that:

- Retail concepts are mixed. One retailer has several different store formats. Every format has some or even many different retail processes and every retail process can be influenced by the fiscal law
- Many different payment methods are used (e.g. paper money, credit cards, vouchers), each of which are usually treated differently by the fiscal law.
- Multichannel retailing is all around. Transactions can be created anytime, anywhere and mostly with different systems (e.g. POS systems, retailer websites, mobile apps).
- Marketing campaigns are very complex. To attract the customer, retailers are getting very creative. They are creating complex promotions with complex discounts. They are, in many cases, strongly influenced by the fiscal law.
- Retailers are becoming more international. At the same time, they are unifying their processes and technology. Yet the fiscal law by country is forcing the usage of certain technologies.

== Technical approaches of fiscalization ==
The technical implementation of the fiscal law always follows one or more of the following technical aspects:

- hardware-based fiscal implementation
- software-based fiscal implementation
- special fiscal requirements with different implementations

In addition, the technical implementation itself is also forced by the fiscal law.

=== Hardware-based fiscal implementation ===
Some fiscal laws define the use of special hardware devices.

These are usually:

- fiscal printers – receipt printers with special fiscal memory where fiscal data is stored
- fiscal communication modules – devices that are used to send fiscal data to the fiscal authority
- fiscal memory boards – circuit boards that can be included in or connected to the POS, ECR, or printer
- signature devices – devices that produce digital signatures which are used to secure the fiscal transaction

Most of the fiscal countries in the world today are following the path of hardware-based implementation.

=== Software-based fiscal implementation ===
This can be a more modern way of implementing the law.

The background is that the law defines how something has to be done but not which device should be used. This model is more liberal, and it can be expected that in the near future more countries will follow this approach.

Today, there are several different scenarios:

- send each transaction to the fiscal authority in real-time, to get a digital signature from the authority and to include it in the transaction.
- store every transaction in the database where every entry has a sequence number and a digital signature
- save data in a special format in special fiscal journal (database)
- digitally sign every transaction by a special algorithm

=== Special fiscal requirements ===
In some cases, in addition to these technical implementations, there are some additional technical approaches. They are mostly related to:

- data security and protection
- archiving
- reporting
- special business processes (mostly in specialized retailing e.g. petrol stations)

== Fiscalization Compliance Management ==
Implementing fiscalization typically requires not only technical changes to invoicing and point-of-sale systems, but also ongoing operational management. Guidance for tax administrations notes that fiscalization is not a one-time “set and forget” process and requires continual planning, communication, monitoring, and evaluation. In practice, organizations often need change-management processes to track regulatory updates, maintain compliant configurations, and support audits and reporting over time.

Some publications propose maturity models for managing fiscalization compliance, including a four-level model described as reactive, fragmented, connected, and strategic.

== Sources of information ==
All legal systems deal with the same basic issues, but jurisdictions categorize and identify their legal topics in different ways. This means that legal systems differ between countries. Not every country has fiscal laws, and not all countries are fiscal.

Tax law involves regulations that concern value-added tax, corporate tax, and income tax. For example, tax laws in some countries may contain fiscal requirements. It depends on the specific country laws, the organization of the countries, and the distribution of responsibilities.

Fiscalization is mandatory in fiscal countries and every company that works with fiscal devices (retailers, suppliers of POS software) is obliged to fiscalize due to the impact on business elements (sales transactions, sales of diplomats, invoice, discounts, payment correction ...).

Fiscal laws change sometimes, so oversight is needed, which is hard because sources vary from country to country. Different institutions are in charge of fiscalization and how the procedure will look like. Problems with obtaining information often are:

- Different languages and speech areas that can create misunderstandings,
- A culture that is nurtured and differs from country to country,
- Not knowing where to look and who is a responsible person, because authorities in each country have differently distributed responsibilities.

Some of the sources that may help are Tax administration offices of the specific countries, different Ministries responsible for fiscalization aspects in-country, consulting fiscal companies, local layers, or some other relevant sources of information (such as fiscal portal).

== Fiscalization law by country ==
Every country has its own laws, so it is the same as fiscal laws. The main challenge is to find a source of information and official documents.

Country	Type	Description
Albania	Software	The new fiscal law is in force since 2019. The usage of a certified software solution that supports real-time communication with the tax authorities is mandatory. Receipts must be issued to the customers and they must include the mandatory elements, as prescribed by the law.
Austria	Hardware/Software	Austria’s fiscalization system, active since 2016/2017, combines hardware and software, requiring fiscal journals (DEP), secure digital signatures, QR codes on receipts, and offline handling. Every POS must be registered with FinanzOnline and support exportable DEP data stored for seven years. Closed systems, used by retailers with over 30 POS devices, require official certification but not digital certificates or POS registration. Failures must be reported, with special procedures for offline sales.
Belgium	Hardware/Software	Belgium's fiscalization system applies to the HoReCa sector, requiring businesses with on-premise sales above EUR 25,000 to use the certified GKS system, which includes a POS system, a Fiscal Data Module (FDM) for secure transaction storage, and a Virtual Smart Card (VSC). Currently, transaction data is stored locally in the FDM and inspected on-site, but with GKS 2.0, real-time data transfer to FPS Finance will be introduced, along with QR codes, e-receipts, and improved transaction speed. Certification remains mandatory for all fiscal devices, and under GKS 2.0, transaction data will be stored in the FPS Finance Cloud, reducing the need for on-site inspections.
Bulgaria	Hardware	In 2018, new fiscal law has been presented, introducing new regulation related to the fiscal devices. Some of the important new requirements are: USN number generated by POS software at the beginning of the transaction, use of QR code on the receipt layout, special voucher handling, special rules for e-shops, etc. There are also some important issues related to the certification process itself.
Bosnia and Herzegovina	Hardware	According to the fiscal law of the country, each retail store is obliged to record every single transaction over fiscal devices. Communication with the tax Authority occurs via GPRS.
Croatia	Online	Croatia’s online fiscalization system mandates real-time transaction authorization for all VAT-registered taxpayers conducting cash transactions. It is entirely software-based, requiring no fiscal hardware, and relies on secure digital certificates issued by FINA. Each transaction must be digitally signed and validated by the Tax Authority, with a unique receipt identifier (JIR). Receipts must include a QR code for consumer verification. The system supports mobile and desktop POS platforms and is backed by comprehensive legislation. Croatia’s model ensures transparency, data integrity, and legal compliance without enforcing hardware certification.
Czech Republic	Non-fiscal	The fiscalization in Czech Republic used to be software-based and included those fiscal relevant transactions had to be sent to the fiscal authority through the Internet to be authorized. This system entered into force in December 2016, was later suspended in 2020 due to pandemic, and was finally cancelled in 2023.
Denmark	Software	Denmark's software-based fiscalization system, introduced in 2019, mandates digital sales registration and compliance for specific industries without requiring real-time transaction reporting to tax authorities. From January 1, 2025, businesses using unregistered ERP systems must ensure their transaction data can be exported in SAF-T format, while all fiscalized businesses must maintain an electronic journal (EJ) for transaction storage. The Danish Tax Administration (SKAT) enforces compliance through audits, imposing fines starting at DKK 10,000 (EUR 1,300) for non-compliance, ensuring secure transaction recording without mandatory certification.
France	Software	France uses a software-based fiscalization model requiring all cash register systems to ensure secure, unalterable, and traceable transaction data. It applies to sales, mobile, and e-commerce cash payments. Receipts must include unique identifiers, with sequential transaction numbers and digital signatures that chain transactions. Event logs, monthly/yearly reports, and strict archiving (6+1 years) are mandatory. Certification is required—either via official bodies or self-certification with strict documentation. Regular and triggered recertification ensures ongoing compliance. France’s model is robust but complex, demanding centralized architecture, thorough documentation, and continuous monitoring.
Germany	Hardware/Software	In Germany, fiscalization requires the use of a certified Technical Security Element (TSE) to secure POS transactions. Businesses can choose between hardware-based (USB, SD card, embedded) or cloud-based TSEs. All POS systems and TSEs must be registered with tax authorities. Transactions must be recorded immediately, signed, time-stamped, and stored securely. The law defines receipt structure, payment types, and data export in DsFinV-K format. Transactions must be logged at start and end. In case of system failure, offline operation is allowed. Cloud TSEs need a local connector. Compliance ensures audit readiness.
Ghana	Software	Ghana's E-VAT system mandates real-time transaction reporting to the GRA for all VAT-registered taxpayers. No hardware is required, but POS apps must be certified. Receipts include QR codes, digital signatures, and timestamps. Offline mode is allowed for 24 hours, with auto-sync. Implementation is phased, ending in 2024. Solutions include a free GRA tool, integrated POS/ERP, or third-party software. VAT rates are 15% standard and 3% reduced for special schemes. The system ensures transparency, flexibility, and compliance across all taxpayer categories.
Greece	Hardware	Greece has implemented fiscalization since 1988, continuously updating regulations to integrate new technologies, including the mandatory QR code on receipts (2021) and real-time data reporting to the myDATA platform. Between 2023 and 2024, businesses were required to interconnect card payments with fiscal receipts and use certified fiscal devices, which store transaction data, maintain an electronic journal, and communicate with tax authorities in real time. From 2024, all transactions must be reported instantly to Greek tax authorities, with non-compliance leading to fines and legal consequences.
Hungary	Hardware	Hungary operates a hardware-based fiscalization system, requiring certified devices and real-time data reporting to NAV. Key devices include fiscal printers and standalone cash registers. The e-Cash register rollout (2025–2028) will support e-receipts, multiple payment methods, and cloud/app options. Mandatory features include item returns, EJ export, HUF/EUR support, and receipt referencing. Both POS apps and fiscal devices need NAV certification. The system ensures compliance, transparency, and is evolving toward digital flexibility.
Italy	Hardware	Italy mandates the use of certified RT devices for real-time or EOD fiscal reporting. Two types exist: RT Fiscal Printers and RT Servers. Devices must generate daily Z-reports, use XML v7.0 format, print QR codes on receipts, and support various payment types. Offline recovery is limited to 12 days. Technical checks are required every two years. From 2025, certified software may be allowed. Italy also operates a receipt lottery to boost compliance.
Lithuania	Hardware	Lithuania has a hardware-based fiscalization system undergoing major reform (2023–2025). A secure module now replaces the old fiscal memory, signing each receipt. Data is sent to the Tax Authority at predefined intervals (not real time). Devices are split into Secure Module (offline capable) and Virtual Module (online only). POS and modules must be jointly certified. Full adoption is mandatory by July 2025. The system supports fiscal/non-fiscal receipts, invoices, and reports, improving security and compliance.
Montenegro	Software	The new fiscal law is in force since 2019. The usage of an electronic cash register (ENU) that enables real-time communication with the tax authorities, through the fiscal server, is mandatory. This fiscalization system requires several registration processes to be conducted.
Norway	Software	Norway's fiscal regulations for cash register systems, fully enforced since January 1, 2019, mandate accurate recording and electronic documentation of all cash sales through a software-based fiscalization model to enhance tax compliance. The Cash Register System Act defines POS system requirements, prohibits certain functions, and requires system providers to submit a conformity declaration before selling or leasing a system. Key obligations include digital signing of transactions, SAF-T format data exports, daily Z-reports, mandatory POS printers, and compliance oversight by the Directorate of Taxes.
Poland	Hardware	From 2019, Poland is introducing a new type of fiscalization which implies that fiscal relevant transactions have to be sent to the fiscal authority through Internet for authorization. Accordingly, major novelty is the introduction of the on-line cash registers.
Portugal	Software	Portugal applies a software-based fiscalization system requiring POS/e-commerce software certification. Certified systems must export SAFT-PT files, sign invoices using RSA, and ensure secure access and logging. Businesses can transmit invoice data in real-time, upload SAFT-PT monthly, or use manual entry. A local contact is required for certification. Compliance involves store registration, number range assignment, and distributor reporting. Fiscal Solutions offers workshops, IFCM services, SAFT-PT uploads, and full local support.
Republic of Srpska	Hardware/Software	As of 2024, the Republic of Srpska uses a real-time electronic fiscalization system with mandatory components: PFR (Local/Virtual), ESIR (POS app), and a Secure Element. Transactions must be signed and sent to the Tax Authority online. The Operator of the Fiscal System (OFS) is the only body allowed to certify L-PFRs and issue secure elements. POS apps must be certified, and recertification is needed after updates. Offline mode is allowed with LPFR and smart cards, for up to 5 days. The reform mirrors Serbia’s model and modernizes compliance and control.
Romania	Hardware	The last change of the Fiscal law regulation dates from November 2017. According to the fiscal legislative, communication and data exchange with ANAF, done by fiscal printer, is even more specifically defined. At the moment, in practise, there is still no automatic communication with ANAF.
Serbia	Software	Serbia moved from hardware- to software-based fiscalization in 2022. Real-time reporting is mandatory via certified POS (ESIR) systems. Two processors exist: V-PFR for cloud/e-commerce and L-PFR for stores with offline support (max 5 days). Receipts must meet legal structure and include QR codes and PFR signatures. Certification is required for POS and L-PFR, handled by local firms only. Though flexible and EU-aligned, the system is complex due to dual architecture, secure elements, and legal compliance demands.
Slovakia	Software/ Hardware	Slovakia uses a SW/HW-based online fiscalization system via e-Kasa, requiring real-time reporting of in-person sales. Businesses may use POS devices, mobile apps, tablets, or PCs, with Protected Data Storage (PDS) for secure transaction records. Certification is required for POS apps and PDS, unless using pre-certified fiscal devices. Receipts include PKP, OKP, UDI, and a QR code. Online sales are excluded unless payment occurs on-site. Slovakia’s model ensures secure, certified, and flexible compliance with fiscal law.
Slovenia	Software	According to fiscal law, it is required to communicate all transactions paid with cash or cash-like payment media with the Tax Authority via the internet. Slovenia adopted this type of fiscal law at the beginning of 2016, and it is very similar to Croatian law.
Spain - Basque Region	Software	The Basque Country uses its own fiscalization system, TicketBAI (TBAI), mandating real-time invoice reporting via certified software. All invoices must be digitally signed and sent online in XML format to provincial tax authorities. There are no specific hardware requirements, but digital certificates are required per device. Each province applies TBAI slightly differently, so businesses must adapt locally. Online sales are also covered. TBAI ensures transparency and positions the region as a leader in Spain’s digital fiscal transformation.
Spain- State Level	Software	Spain is preparing for nationwide fiscalization through the VeriFactu project, mandatory from July 2025 (or January 2026). Businesses must switch to certified billing software that ensures data integrity, traceability, and real-time reporting to the tax authority (AEAT). Invoices will require a QR code, unique ID, and secure storage. Two modes are allowed: VeriFactu(online) and Non-VeriFactu (offline with controls). Strict penalties apply for non-compliance. VeriFactu marks a major shift in Spain’s digital tax strategy.
Sweden	Hardware	Since 2010, Sweden mandates hardware-based fiscalization using certified cash registers and control units. All cash and card transactions must be registered, and a control code must be printed on receipts. As of 2023, systems must support XML export of journal data. Daily Z-reports, return receipts, and non-sales activity logs are required. Devices and manufacturers must be registered and verified by the Swedish Tax Agency, ensuring transparency, real-time monitoring, and strict compliance with national fiscal laws.
Turkey	Hardware/Software	Turkey's fiscalization system integrates certified hardware and software, requiring online communication with the Tax Authority (GIB). Since 2018, New Generation Cash Registers (YN OKC) have been mandatory, with options like all-in-one devices for small taxpayers, fiscal printers for POS integration, and software-based e-invoicing for high-revenue businesses. The 2022 E-Document System enables full digital fiscalization, replacing cash registers if requirements are met, while certification remains mandatory but exclusive to Turkish companies.

=== Albania ===
Albania (AL) uses the Albanian Lek (ALL) and operates an online fiscalization system, ensuring real-time transaction reporting to tax authorities. Businesses must register via the central billing platform at least 24 hours before opening. POS applications must be certified, but no specific hardware is required. Receipts must be issued through certified software (application, integrated system, or cloud-based) with digital certificates for transaction signing. Fiscalization requires official certificates, registered software, and a unique software solution code from NAIS. Cash-handling businesses must register a daily cash deposit, except those operating solely with cashless transactions or web shops. Key fiscal data includes the Fiscal Receipt Number, Receipt Issuer Security Number, Unique ID Code, and Operator Code. Required fiscal transactions include sales, returns, advance payments, simplified invoices, and summary invoices, ensuring VAT compliance through real-time reporting.

=== Austria ===
Austria’s fiscalization system, in place since 2016/2017, uses a combined model of hardware and software. It mandates a fiscal journal (DEP), QR/barcode/OCR on receipts, integration with a fiscal security system, and the ability to operate offline. All POS systems must support real-time journal updates, export data in a legally defined format, and store it for seven years. Security devices must be certified and registered with FinanzOnline. In case of system failures, retailers must follow strict reporting and data recovery procedures. Retailers with more than 30 POS devices can use a closed system, which doesn't require individual device registration, signature devices, or digital certificates, but must be certified by an accredited expert and re-certified after changes. Our solution supports various fiscal architectures, ensures compliance with all legal requirements, integrates with FinanzOnline, and assists with certification. This helps retailers manage fiscal obligations efficiently while reducing operational costs and complexity in Austria’s regulated environment.

=== Belgium ===
Belgium’s fiscalization system applies to the HoReCa sector, requiring businesses with on-premise sales above EUR 25,000 to use a fiscalized cash register system (GKS). Retail businesses are not subject to fiscalization.

The GKS system consists of a certified POS system, a Fiscal Data Module (FDM) for secure transaction storage, and a Virtual Smart Card (VSC), which will be removed in GKS 2.0. Transaction data is stored locally in the FDM and inspected on-site, as Belgium does not require real-time reporting to tax authorities. All fiscal devices, data modules, and POS systems must be certified, and manufacturers/importers must be registered with FPS Finance.

=== Fiscal Documents Generated ===
- Receipts: Sales, return, advance payment, proforma, training
- Reports: Z-Day (end of day), X-Day (mid-day)

The GKS 2.0 system will introduce real-time data transfer to FPS Finance, eliminate the VSC, implement QR codes and e-receipts, and improve transaction speed. Certification remains mandatory for cash registers, POS systems, and FDMs. With GKS 2.0, transaction data will be stored in the FPS Finance Cloud, reducing the need for on-site inspections.

=== Bosnia and Herzegovina ===
The fiscal system in FBIH, established in 2011, remains hardware-based, relying on fiscal printers, cash registers (ECRs), and communication terminals. However, a major reform is underway with the Draft Law on Fiscalization of Financial Transactions, introduced in 2024 and expected to be enacted by mid-2025.

The key change introduced in the draft law is the Centralized Fiscal Platform, a government-managed system for fiscal data. Additionally, the system will transition from hardware-based fiscalization to Electronic Fiscal Systems (EFS), allowing businesses to adopt modern digital solutions. The introduction of electronic invoicing (e-invoices) aims to further streamline financial transactions.

Other important updates include new receipt and invoice requirements, such as mandatory QR codes and standardized formats to enhance data exchange. The scope of compliance is also expanding, requiring more businesses and sales channels to adhere to fiscalization regulations.

The law is currently under parliamentary review and is expected to take effect by May or June 2025. Compliance deadlines will be determined once the law is officially enacted. This reform aims to modernize tax compliance, enhance efficiency, and streamline financial transactions in FBIH.

=== Bulgaria ===
Bulgaria employs an online hardware-based fiscalization system centered around fiscal printers equipped with Tax Terminals for real-time data transmission to tax authorities. Fiscalization is mandatory for all sales of goods and services, with a few exceptions.

==== Key Aspects of Bulgarian Fiscalization ====
- Data Flow: Fiscal printers send transaction data in XML format every 5 minutes; tax authorities must respond within 60 seconds.
- Device Certification: Fiscal printers require homologation by the Bulgarian Metrology Institute; EU-approved devices are pre-certified.
- POS Software: Certification is not mandatory, but SUPTO POS software requires a special declaration.
- Receipts: All fiscal receipts must include a USN number and QR code.
- E-commerce: Online sales have specific fiscalization rules.
- Infrastructure: A SIM card is required for tax communication.

Bulgaria anticipates the adoption of the Euro in 2026, potentially affecting fiscalization rules. Retailers must comply with sales registration, fiscal receipt issuance, and periodic reporting, ensuring transparency and regulatory compliance.

=== Croatia ===
Croatia’s fiscalization system is a real-time, software-based solution mandatory for all VAT-registered businesses performing cash transactions. Introduced to improve transparency and reduce the shadow economy, it requires no specific fiscal hardware or POS software certification. Each transaction must be digitally signed using official FINA-issued certificates and authorized in real time by the Tax Authority, which issues a unique identifier (JIR). Receipts must include a QR code, enabling consumers to verify authenticity within 30 days via SMS or online. Core transaction elements include the receipt number (RB), issuer’s security code (ZKI), JIR, and tax ID (OIB). The system supports both mobile and desktop POS platforms and offers demo environments for testing. Backed by detailed legal frameworks such as the Cash Transaction Fiscalisation Act and VAT Act, Croatia’s approach ensures full traceability, strong data integrity, and legal compliance. It is a scalable, flexible, and customer-focused model ideal for businesses entering the Croatian market.

=== Czech Republic ===
The fiscalization system in Czech Republic used to require that all transactions paid with cash or cash-like payment media be sent to the Tax Authority via the internet for authorization. This system was introduced in December 2016 but was alter suspended in 2020 due to pandemic. During this suspension period, Czech government concluded that this system in no longer serving its purpose, and thus decided to cancel it in 2023. Therefore, from January 1, 2023, taxpayers are no longer obliged to send sales data to tax Authority for authorization. Moreover, the EET Portal is completely abolished.

=== Denmark ===
Denmark has a software-based fiscalization system that applies to specific businesses. Unlike other countries, Denmark does not require real-time transaction reporting to tax authorities but focuses on digital sales registration and internal compliance.

The system was introduced in 2019, with mandatory adoption for certain industries starting January 1, 2024. From January 1, 2025, businesses using unregistered ERP systems must ensure their data can be exported in SAF-T format.

Businesses subject to fiscalization must maintain an electronic journal (EJ) where all transactions are stored in SAF-T format. POS systems must print receipts, handle various payment methods, and digitally sign transactions using an OCES certificate issued by the Agency for Digital Government.

The Danish Tax Administration (SKAT) conducts audits, and non-compliance results in fines starting at DKK 10,000 (EUR 1,300), with higher penalties for repeated violations. Denmark’s system ensures secure transaction recording without requiring certification or real-time reporting, but businesses must ensure compliance to avoid penalties.

=== France ===
France enforces a software-based fiscalization system designed to combat tax fraud by securing transaction data from cash registers. It applies to all sales, including mobile and e-commerce transactions paid in cash. Each transaction must have a unique, sequential number, digital signature (chained to the previous one), and fiscal receipt details, including a certification number and total item lines. From August 1, 2023, paper receipts are no longer printed automatically, allowing for digital alternatives. Systems must log specific events (JET log), generate monthly/yearly turnover reports, and store all data for the current year plus six previous years. Certification is mandatory, either through official bodies (e.g., Infocert, LNE) or via self-certification, which requires strict documentation in French. Certification is valid for three years, with annual reviews and re-certification triggered by major changes. Despite its complexity, France’s system ensures high data integrity and demands centralized system architecture, strict compliance procedures, and extensive QA and technical documentation.

=== Ghana ===
Ghana operates a real-time, software-based fiscalization system called E-VAT, applicable to all VAT-registered taxpayers. There are no hardware requirements, but POS systems must be certified and integrated with the Ghana Revenue Authority (GRA) via API. Transactions are reported in real time to the GRA, and receipts must include digital signatures, QR codes, and timestamps. The system supports offline operation for up to 24 hours, with automatic syncing upon reconnection. Implementation began in October 2022, with large taxpayers first, followed by medium and small taxpayers, targeting full coverage by the end of 2024. Three solution models are offered: a free GRA solution, integration with existing POS/ERP systems, and third-party certified software. The standard VAT rate is 15%, with a reduced rate of 3% for special VAT schemes. Receipts may be issued in printed or electronic format. The E-VAT system enhances tax transparency and simplifies compliance while offering flexible technical solutions.

=== Germany ===
Fiscalization in Germany is governed by regulations requiring the use of certified Technical Security Elements (TSE) to secure point-of-sale (POS) transactions. Retailers may choose between hardware-based (e.g., USB, SD/microSD cards, embedded devices) or cloud-based fiscalization. Mixing different TSE types within a business is allowed.

While POS software does not require certification, both the POS and TSE must be registered with tax authorities. All transactions must be recorded immediately and unalterably after completion. The TSE is responsible for generating a unique transaction number, signing each transaction, maintaining a signature counter, and storing data in secure memory with a valid timestamp.

German fiscal law defines rules for receipt elements, payment types, and data export formats (DsFinV-K). It mandates that every business-relevant transaction be signed and stored. In hospitality, order recording is required. Provisions also exist for offline operation and audits.

TSE integration must follow a government-defined API, though providers may add custom features. Local software connectors are necessary for cloud TSEs. Businesses must register the start and stop of TSE and POS usage, and understand detailed procedures for compliant data handling and export.

=== Greece ===
Greece has a long history of fiscalization, dating back to 1988, with continuous updates to adapt to new technologies. The latest fiscal law, established in 2012, has undergone several amendments, including the mandatory QR code on receipts (2021) and real-time fiscal data reporting to the myDATA platform.

A key shift occurred between 2023 and 2024, introducing mandatory interconnection of card payments with fiscal receipts. Businesses must use certified fiscal printers or electronic cash registers (ECRs) to issue and report receipts. These devices must store transaction data, maintain an electronic journal, and communicate with tax authorities in real time.

The myDATA platform ensures compliance by monitoring retail sales transactions. Businesses must report key transaction details, including VAT rates and total values. Certification of fiscal devices is required, with approvals managed by the Ministry of Finance.

From 2024, all transactions must be reported in real-time to Greek tax authorities. Non-compliance leads to fines and legal consequences, making adherence to fiscal regulations crucial for businesses.

=== Hungary ===
Hungary uses a hardware-based fiscalization system, requiring certified fiscal devices and real-time data transmission to the Hungarian Tax Authority (NAV). Fiscalization began in 1999, with the Online Cash Register (OPG) system launched in 2014 and expanded in 2016. Between 2025–2028, Hungary will introduce e-Cash registers (ePG), offering hardware, cloud, and app-based options with features like e-receipts, multi-payment support, and loyalty integration. Current fiscal devices include fiscal printers and standalone cash registers, which print paper receipts and transmit data via GSM. Mandatory functionalities include item return handling, exporting the electronic journal to USB, dual currency support (HUF/EUR), and receipt linking for refunds. Devices must be certified by NAV, and POS applications must follow strict integration rules. Custom layouts are available for retail, fuel, and healthcare. The system ensures full traceability, compliance, and prepares for the transition to modern digital retail..

=== Italy ===
Italy is a pioneer in fiscalization, known for its hardware-based system. Since 2021, all retailers must use "Registratore Telematico" (RT) devices to send transaction data directly to the Tax Authority. There are two RT types: RT Fiscal Printers for individual POS and RT Servers for managing multiple POS systems. Both must ensure end-of-day (EOD) reporting, use secure protocols, and be verified every two years. RT devices generate Z-reports daily and print a unique QR code as proof of compliance. In offline scenarios, businesses have up to 12 days to recover data. Receipts must follow XML v7.0 format (since 2022) and support various types, including sales, return, void, and test receipts. Supported payments include cash, card, vouchers, deferred payments, and more. Italy also runs a receipt lottery to promote compliance. Invoices can be issued but are non-fiscal. A shift toward software-based fiscalization is expected from 2025. The system’s complexity includes tight integration, frequent checks, support for multiple payment/document types, and store-level data consolidation via RT Servers.

=== Lithuania ===
Lithuania uses a hardware-based fiscalization system, which began a major transformation in January 2023. The traditional fiscal memory block is being replaced by a secure module with encryption functionality. This module digitally signs each receipt, whether fiscal or non-fiscal. Unlike real-time systems, Lithuania’s new model sends receipt data to the State Tax Inspectorate (STI) at predefined intervals, allowing periodic synchronization. Full compliance with the new system is required by July 2025.

Fiscal devices include certified cash registers or POS systems, categorized into two types:

- Secure Module Devices: Sign receipts, store data, and transmit it without needing an internet connection.
- Virtual Module Devices: Use online communication but lack internal secure hardware, making them more suitable for smaller retailers.

All fiscal devices and POS systems must be jointly certified, and only authorized vendors may sell certified equipment. Supported documents include fiscal and non-fiscal receipts, invoices, voids, X/Z reports, and monthly reports. Lithuania’s fiscal upgrade aims to enhance data integrity, security, and compliance while introducing flexibility in data transmission.

=== Montenegro ===
Montenegro's fiscalization system operates on an online model, ensuring real-time communication with the Tax Authority. Store registration is mandatory, and all transactions must be reported online. No fiscal device certification is required, but POS software must be registered. Receipts are issued via standard or mobile POS systems, digitally signed using official certificates from CoreIT or Montenegro Post, valid for up to five years. Key fiscal data elements include the Fiscal Receipt Number, Unique Receipt ID, ID Code, and Operator Code. Businesses must register their software and integrate the Tax Authority-issued unique ID into the POS system. Only companies officially registered in Montenegro can obtain the required certificates.

=== Norway ===
Norway's fiscal regulations for cash register systems took effect on January 1, 2017, with full enforcement from January 1, 2019. These regulations focus on accurate recording and reporting of cash transactions through a software-based fiscalization model. All cash sales must be registered at the point of sale (POS) and documented electronically to enhance tax compliance and minimize tax evasion.

The Cash Register System Act defines mandatory POS features, prohibits specific functions, and requires compliance oversight by the Directorate of Taxes. System providers must submit a conformity declaration before selling or leasing a system, ensuring compliance with legal standards.

==== Key requirements ====
- Digital Signing: Transactions must be digitally signed and stored in an Electronic Journal (EJ) for audits.
- Electronic Journal (EJ) Export: Data must be available in SAF-T format per store, terminal, or network.
- Daily Reporting: Retailers must generate Z-reports summarizing daily transactions.
- POS Printer: Each POS must have a functioning printer for proper documentation.
- Conformity Declarations: Suppliers must notify tax authorities of any non-compliance.

The regulations balance compliance with system flexibility, ensuring transparency and accountability in Norway’s retail sector.

=== Poland ===
Poland’s fiscalization system relies on hardware-based online solutions ensuring real-time transaction reporting to the Tax Authority. The country employs four types of fiscal devices: fiscal printers, electronic cash registers, online cash registers, and virtual cash registers (for specific taxpayers). Since 2018, Poland has mandated an online connection for fiscal devices, phasing out traditional models. Industry-specific deadlines were set for adopting online cash registers: repair services and fuel sales (2020), food services and solid fuel sales (2020-2021), and hairdressing, cosmetics, legal, and medical services (2021). Devices must feature fiscal memory, customer display, secure online data transmission, and QR code printing. Homologation is required for fiscal printers, with re-homologation ensuring compliance. Businesses must issue fiscal receipts, invoices, daily Z reports, and periodic reports. Poland’s system prioritizes transparency and efficiency, enhancing compliance and streamlining fiscal operations.

=== Portugal ===
Portugal uses a software-based fiscalization system with no hardware requirements, but strict software certification rules apply. POS and e-commerce systems must be certified by the tax authority. Certification is free but detailed, and every major software version needs re-certification. A local contact is mandatory for credentials but isn't the certificate owner. Certified software must export SAFT-PT files, sign transactions with RSA encryption, support user authentication, log all changes, and ensure secure access. Systems must handle invoices (FT, FS, FR), credit/debit notes, pro forma documents, and payments. Real-time data transmission is possible via web services, or businesses can upload SAFT-PT files monthly. A third option allows manual entry for low-volume users. The communication method must remain fixed throughout the year. Compliance is complex due to the need for local contacts, software/stores/number range registration, and reporting of installation providers. Fiscal Solutions offers workshops, IFCM services, SAFT-PT upload tools, and full compliance support, including hotline services and certification project management.

=== Republic of Srpska ===
The Republic of Srpska introduced its initial hardware-based fiscalization system in 2008, using ECRs and fiscal printers. In 2024, a new fiscal law modernized the system, transitioning toward real-time electronic fiscalization. The updated model includes mandatory use of components such as PFR (Local or Virtual), ESIR (POS app), and a Secure Element. Real-time transaction reporting to the Tax Authority (TA) is required, and all POS applications must be certified. A key feature of the reform is the Operator of the Fiscal System (OFS), the only entity authorized to certify L-PFRs and issue Secure Elements. Transactions must be signed by the PFR and include a QR code and PFR number on the receipt. Offline mode is permitted for up to 5 days with certified LPFR and smart card. Certification is mandatory for both the POS app (ESIR) and fiscal devices, with recertification required after software changes. This reform ensures tighter control, data security, and compliance through a hybrid model that supports both local and virtual solutions.

=== Romania ===
Romania's fiscalization system is hardware-based, requiring certified fiscal printers that transmit transaction data to the National Agency for Fiscal Administration (ANAF). Initially established in 1999, fiscal regulations saw major updates in 2017 and 2020, with mandatory online data transmission. From September 2025, QR codes must be included on fiscal receipts.

Businesses accepting card payments are no longer required to print fiscal receipts, though they remain an option. The system includes fiscal printers with components such as fiscal memory, an electronic journal (EJ), and a data communication module. Certified fiscal printers must be connected to both the POS system and ANAF.

Key aspects:

- Required devices: Fiscal printer, customer display, and printer-attached keyboard (for certified setups).
- Offline operations: A grace period is allowed for failed connections, requiring manual data uploads.
- Receipts: Various receipt types exist, with refunds processed manually.
- Certification: Mandatory for all fiscal solutions, conducted by the ICI Institute, valid for five years.
- Data storage: Backups required; EJ data must be stored for 10 years.

=== Serbia ===
Serbia introduced fiscalization in 2004 using hardware-based systems. In 2022, it transitioned to a software-driven model with cloud capabilities, while still allowing local hardware (L-PFR) in certain setups. Every POS system (ESIR) must be certified, and real-time transaction reporting to the Tax Authority is mandatory. Serbia’s system is built around the SUF (Tax Management System) with two processor types: V-PFR for cloud/e-commerce and L-PFR for physical stores, which includes secure elements and smart cards for offline mode (up to 5 days). Receipts must include a QR code, PFR signature, and legally defined content. Certification is required for both software and hardware, handled only by local entities. Manual export of transaction data is required in emergencies. Complexity arises from integration with processors, secure hardware use, dual architecture, legal structure, and frequent re-certification. Despite challenges, Serbia offers a scalable, modern, EU-aligned fiscalization model for retailers.

=== Slovakia ===
Slovakia uses a hybrid fiscalization system (SW/HW) based on online communication with the Financial Directorate via the e-Kasa system. Every in-person sale must be reported in real time, while online sales are excluded unless payment occurs on the premises. Businesses can use various devices—ECRs, POS systems with fiscal printers, mobile apps, tablets, or PCs—as long as they support real-time data transmission. Devices must be registered and receive a unique ID code. The system utilizes Protected Data Storage (PDS) for secure, one-time data entry and storage. Key receipt elements include a Verification Code (OKP), Signature Code (PKP), UDI, and a QR code for validation. Certification is mandatory for POS applications and PDS unless pre-certified fiscal devices are used. The e-Kasa Virtual Cash Register is also available via a government-provided web/mobile service. Slovakia’s fiscal model emphasizes flexibility, security, and transparent transaction reporting, aiming to reduce tax evasion and increase digital compliance.

=== Slovenia ===
Slovenia employs an online fiscalization system requiring all taxpayers to register and transmit transaction data to tax authorities in real time. Businesses must issue receipts via a compliant Point of Sale (POS) system or mobile device, which must support digital certificates for transaction signing and maintain an internet connection for authorization.

==== Key identifiers in the fiscalization process include ====
- RS (Receipt ID): A company-generated unique identifier.
- ZOI (Protection ID): Another company-generated identifier ensuring security.
- EOR (Unique Receipt Identifier): Issued by fiscal authorities during authorization.

Receipts must include the cashier’s signature and the business's tax number. Official certificates are mandatory for transaction signing, and only registered businesses can obtain them. Both demo and production certificates are available for testing and implementation.

Fiscalization is regulated by laws such as the Tax Certification of Invoices Act, VAT Act, and Tax Procedure Act, alongside bylaws like the Fiscal Verification of Invoices rules. These regulations ensure compliance, enhance transparency, and mitigate tax evasion.

=== Spain - The Basque Region ===
The Basque Country (Gipuzkoa, Álava, Biscay) operates a region-specific fiscalization model called TicketBAI (TBAI), separate from Spain’s national VeriFactu initiative. TBAI is a software-based system that mandates real-time invoice reporting to provincial tax authorities, with no predefined hardware. Businesses must use certified billing software capable of digitally signing each invoice and transmitting a structured XML version online. Each device must have a digital certificate installed, ensuring traceability and authenticity. Invoices (including simplified ones) must follow strict structure and be securely archived. Although TBAI rules are unified in concept, each province applies different implementation calendars and technical rules, requiring special attention from businesses operating across multiple regions. Both local and online transactions must comply with TBAI, reinforcing full invoicing transparency. TicketBAI marks the Basque region as a frontrunner in Spain’s fiscal digitization efforts, demanding compliance with certified software, secure communication, and data retention obligations.

=== Spain - The State Level ===
Spain is currently transitioning from a non-fiscalized environment to a regulated one, with the VeriFactu project set to become mandatory from July 2025 (possibly extended to January 2026). At present, there are no legal obligations for businesses to use certified billing systems, allowing flexibility in tools and formats. However, all transactions must be invoiced and documented for VAT and bookkeeping purposes. With VeriFactu, Spain introduces a mandatory software-based fiscalization model focused on integrity, traceability, and immutability of transaction data. Businesses will need to use compliant billing systems that transmit invoices in real time to the Tax Administration (AEAT), include QR codes, use a specific invoice numbering series, and prevent data alteration. Two operational modes will be supported: VeriFactu Mode (real-time communication) and Non-VeriFactu Mode (offline storage with strict integrity controls). Penalties for non-compliance are high—up to €150,000 for software providers and €50,000 for users. The reform marks a significant shift in Spain’s approach to combating tax fraud and requires early preparation to meet the technical and legal obligations by the 2025/2026 deadlines.

=== Sweden ===
Sweden introduced mandatory hardware-based fiscalization in 2010 for all businesses conducting cash or card transactions. Each transaction must be processed through a certified cash register system paired with a control unit (CU). The CU verifies, encrypts, and stores transaction data and returns a control code, which is printed on each receipt. These systems must be registered with the Swedish Tax Agency (Skatteverket). Since January 2023, cash registers with journal memory must support XML data export. The system requires the issuance of fiscal receipts, Z (daily) reports, and documentation of various transaction types, including returns, training operations, and drawer openings. Control units must be certified by an accredited body, while cash register manufacturers must submit declarations of compliance. The Swedish system ensures real-time verification, strict control, and transparent reporting through standardized hardware, making it one of the most robust fiscalization frameworks in Europe.

=== Turkey ===
Turkey's fiscalization system combines hardware and software solutions, requiring certified fiscal devices and POS applications with online communication to the Tax Authority (GIB). Fiscalization began in 1985, with major updates in 2013 and 2016. Since 2018, New Generation Cash Registers (YN OKC) have been mandatory.

Turkey offers multiple fiscalization options:

- All-in-One Device: EFT-POS integrated cash registers for small taxpayers.
- Fiscal Printer with Cash Register: Hardware-based, third-party POS integration.
- B2B/B2C E-Invoicing: Software-based solutions for high-revenue businesses.
- Certified Custom Solutions: Costly, available only to Turkish companies.

Receipts include YN OKC sales receipts, integrated sales tickets, and information slips. Self-employed individuals, agricultural businesses, and wholesalers are exempt. The 2022 E-Document System enables full digital fiscalization, replacing cash registers if requirements are met. Certification is required, but only for Turkish companies. Retailers meeting financial criteria can adopt the e-Archive System for digital transactions.
