= IBM 4694 =

IBM SurePOS 4694
- Manufacturer: IBM
- Released: 1991
- Discontinued: 2005
- Predecessor: IBM 4683; IBM 4693
- Successor: IBM 4695
- Related: IBM 4614 SureOne

The IBM 4694 was one of IBM's PC based point of sale (POS) systems, a successor to the IBM 4683 and IBM 4693. Introduced in 1991, the 4694 became a flagship model for the company's SurePOS system. The system consists of a PC-based controller, and PC-based POS Terminals—typically an IBM keyboard and monitor, or touch screen. The system requires the IBM 4694 computer which is used as a "Controller", or also more or less, as a server on the network. The controller can be set up to boot from a floppy disk, or from a main server on a network. The 4694 was a best-selling POS System, widely used in most large chain stores such as supermarkets, department stores and restaurants. The 4694 could still be seen in the wild at US Foot Locker locations until 2020.

This system was replaced with the IBM 4695.

== See also ==
- Digital Research
- FlexOS
- IBM 4680 OS
- IBM 4690 OS
- IBM Printer Model 4 (IBM 4694 Printer)
  Preceded by IBM 4683; IBM 4693	IBM 4694; 1991-2005	Succeeded by IBM 4695
