= Emios =

Emios (an acronym for Environmental Memory Interoperable Open Service) is an MDD / MDE platform that aims to provide a range of services for storing and sharing information about environmental research activities.

== History ==
Emios, initiated by C. Faucher in June 2006, is based on the environmental memory concepts developed by the "Motive" CNRS committee and specifically by Franck Guarnieri in 2003.

Emios is a set of Eclipse plugins based on EMF, distributed under the terms of the EPL License. The current version is the 0.0.1 and mainly contains the Geographic Information Standards Manager: GISM. GISM is the first part of Emios and implements the ISO 19100 series of International Standards from ISO TC211.

== Scientific References ==
Faucher C., Gourmelon F., Lafaye J.Y., Rouan M., "Mise en place d’une mémoire environnementale adaptée aux besoins d’un observatoire du domaine cotier : MEnIr", Revue Internationale de Géomatique, Hermès/Lavoisier, vol 19/1, doi:10.3166/geo.19.7-26, pp. 7–26, 2009, http://geo.e-revues.com/

Faucher C., Lafaye J.Y., 2007. Model-Driven Engineering for implementing the ISO 19100 series of international standards, "CoastGIS 07, the 8th International Symposium on GIS and Computer Mapping for Coastal Zone Management", vol. 2, p. 424-433, 7–10 October, Santander, Spain.

== Related link ==
Emios web site
