= Environmental memory =

Environmental memory is the sum of explicit, persistent and structured data of knowledges, models and scientific expertise linked to an environmental observation system to ease long-term access, sharing and reusability of the information.

Diverse environmental memory is embedded in different regions and this "spatially distributed environmental memory" can be shared via interpersonal networks and social learning.

The open-source project Emios is an implementation of environmental memory.
