= AGP Inline Memory Module =

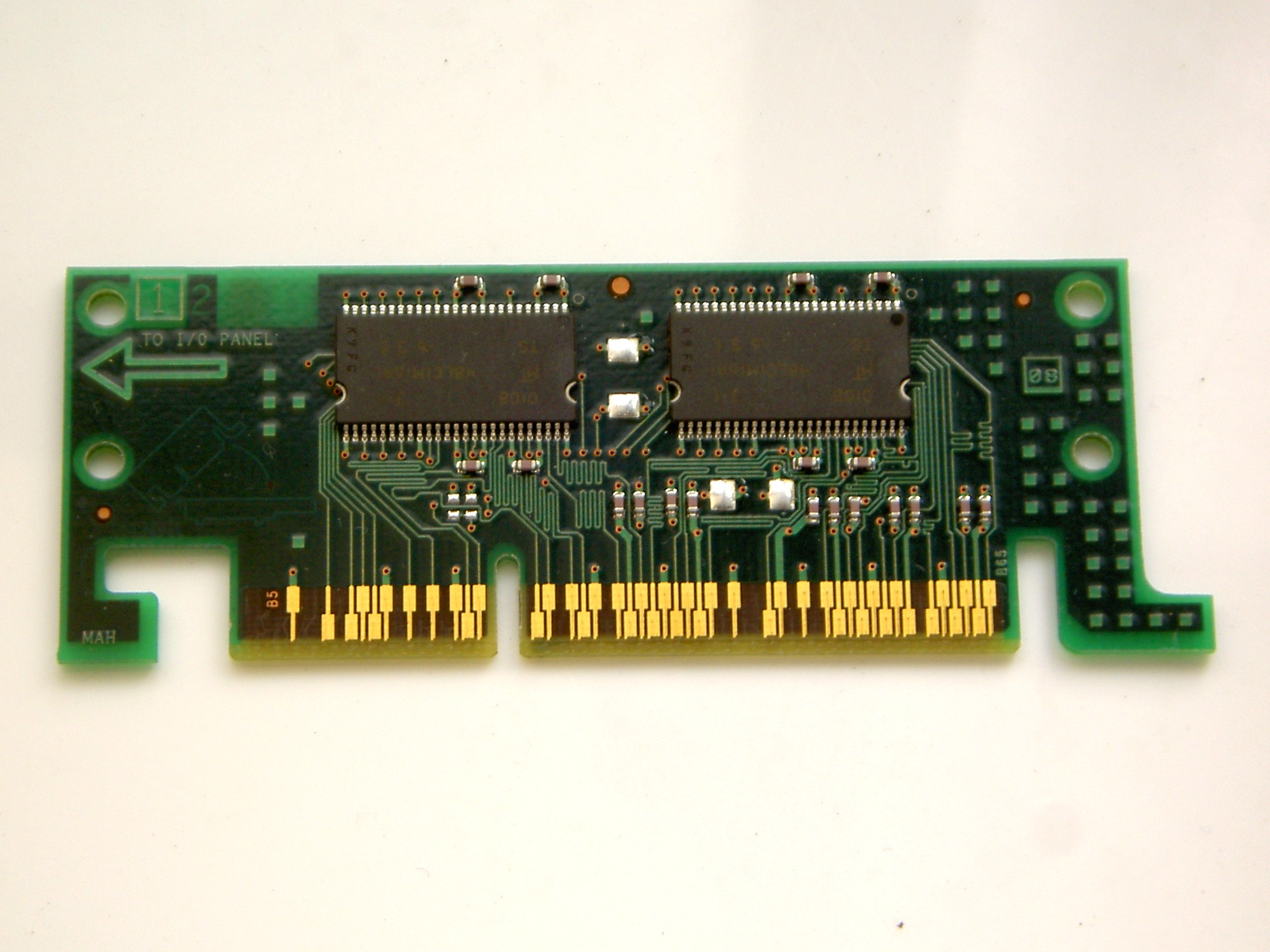
AIMM card

AGP Inline Memory Module (AIMM) also known as Graphics Performance Accelerator (GPA) is an expansion card that fits in the AGP slot of PC motherboards based on Intel 815 chipsets with onboard graphics, like the ASUS CUSL-2 with an AGP Pro slot and Abit SH6 with an AGP Universal slot. It is intended to be a mid-level cost solution between shared graphics memory and dedicated graphics memory found on more expensive discrete AGP expansion card. AIMM cards are special memory modules that are used as dedicated video memory (display cache) to store Z-buffering and they usually have 4 MB of 32-bit wide SDRAM.
