= Deterministic memory =

In computing, deterministic memory is computer memory which contains values that can be depended on from access to access. The term is also used in conjunction with achieving real-time functionality, especially in conjunction with embedded processor applications.

== See also ==
- Embedded system
- Memory management
- Real-time computing
