= Aperture (computer memory) =

In computing, an aperture is a portion of physical address space (i.e. physical memory) that is associated with a particular peripheral device or a memory unit. Apertures may reach external devices such as ROM or RAM chips, or internal memory on the CPU itself.

Typically, a memory device attached to a computer accepts addresses starting at zero, and so a system with more than one such device would have ambiguous addressing. To resolve this, the memory logic will contain several aperture selectors, each containing a range selector and an interface to one of the memory devices.

The set of selector address ranges of the apertures are disjoint. When the CPU presents a physical address within the range recognized by an aperture, the aperture unit routes the request (with the address remapped to a zero base) to the attached device. Thus, apertures form a layer of address translation below the level of the usual virtual-to-physical mapping.

== See also ==
- Address bus
- AGP aperture
- Memory-mapped I/O
