= Fiscal memory device =

Electronic tax recording devices

Fiscal Memory Devices (FMDs) are electronic devices used to record sales tax owed to a country. As of 2004, they are widely used in countries around the world, including Russia, Bulgaria, Serbia, Romania, Republic of Macedonia, Albania, Argentina, Poland, Moldova, Bosnia and Herzegovina, Kazakhstan, Armenia, Georgia, Kenya, Tanzania, Malawi, and Ethiopia.

== Description ==
Fiscal memory devices are electronic devices used to record sales tax owed to a country. All such devices contain fiscal memory: a piece of electronic equipment that connects to a sales point terminal and records taxation for public revenue. Fiscal memory is a memory device that is certified by an appropriate government body. This encrypted module is usually in the form of an integrated circuit on a printer or cash register's printed circuit board.

An electronic journal is a kind of encrypted memory module that is readable using a fiscal device such as an electronic tax register or fiscal printer. These memory modules are based on SD and Micro SD cards but feature an encrypted format to prevent tampering or unauthorized access. Once this electronic journal is initialized in a fiscal device, it is assigned a fiscal serial number to prevent it from being reused in another fiscal device.

== Distribution and categorization ==
The use of fiscal devices worldwide can be divided into three generations of technology:

1. Offline-operating electronic fiscal devices with built-in fiscal memory (so-called first-generation fiscal devices);
2. Electronic fiscal devices with Internet connection capabilities to the revenue authority central server (so-called second-generation fiscal devices);
3. Electronic fiscal devices with Internet connection capabilities and various encryption methods for digital signing of each issued receipt (third-generation fiscal devices).

First generation fiscal devices had certain disadvantages (i.e.: easy manipulation, lack of control from the tax office, no printing of fiscal receipts, etc.), due to the limitations of technology and infrastructure when they were developed. This has made the second generation fiscal devices increasingly popular, and many countries are changing their fiscal requirements and moving to Internet-enabled fiscal devices (often using GPRS network) and implementing the so-called online Information and Tax Collection System.

Second-generation fiscal devices eliminated most of the problems associated with their predecessors. Second generation fiscal cash registers and fiscal printers are connected through the Internet to the tax agency's central server and send their reports and/or fiscal receipts in predefined time intervals. However, these devices contain substantial flaws that leave room for exploitation, such as the printing of fake fiscal receipts, manipulation of daily reports, etc.

Third generation fiscal devices have been introduced in several countries. Devices of this kind are very similar to the second generation devices, but with additional software security used for the digital signing of fiscal receipts. These third-generation fiscal devices eliminate all previously known issues and give additional security to the tax agencies that employ them. Each fiscal receipt is digitally signed using a unique signature printed either in the form of a 2D bar code or various characters depending on the agency's rules regarding encryption. This allows the tax agency to easily authenticate these receipts.

=== Categories ===
Fiscal memory devices have the following categories:

- Electronic cash registers, fiscal cash registers
- Printers, fiscal printers
- E-Signs, electronic signature devices

== Countries using fiscal memory devices ==
Country Name	More Info
Albania	Fiscal printer law since 2008
Argentina	Fiscal printer law since 1995
Austria	Austria introduced regulations in 2016 requiring a fiscal journal to be saved at point of sale (POS), a central database or in cloud storage. Additional regulations expected in 2017 were to include a digital signature of every receipt. Closed-system retailers with more than 30 cash registers can be exempted with a special government certificate.
Bangladesh	
Bosnia and Herzegovina	Fiscalization was implemented by 2011, with all selling points obliged to record every turnover by fiscal device, regardless of how payment was made. All taxpayers have to create and print daily reports at the close of business, and also periodical reports.
Brazil	Fiscal printers since 2005
Bulgaria	
Canada	As of 2009, only used in the Quebec restaurant industry.
Croatia	A cloud-based software-only solution, since January 2013 it fiscalizes every transaction at POS, relayed to the fiscal authority by Internet. The central server returns identification keys, which have to be printed on every receipt. The recorded data includes amounts, income taxes, cashier personal identification number (OIB), and payment information. In the absence of an Internet connection, each account has to be printed and later reauthorized, within 48 hours. Benefits of this type of fiscalization are reflected in an increase of tax income, the number of issued receipts, an increase of value-added tax (VAT) companies and better control of working time. This software system does not require new hardware equipment and hardware maintenance on the part of retailers.
Chile	Fiscal law adopted since 2007
Czech Republic	Fiscal regulation expected in March 2017 would be similar to that of Croatia and Slovenia.
Ethiopia	Ethiopia introduced fiscal cash registers and fiscal printers with integrated fiscal memory in 2008, following a fiscal law enacted in 2007
Gambia	
Greece	
Hungary	
Italy	Fiscal printer law since 1990
Kenya	
Latvia	
Lithuania	
Malta	
Mexico	Electronic invoice adoption since 2015
Montenegro	Fiscalization was adopted in 2001. Each fiscal device must have a unique record number which is entered in the fiscal memory of the fiscal cash registers.
North Macedonia	Fiscal systems including fiscal cash registers, fiscal printers, and other electronic systems with fiscal memory (such as systems at petroleum stations). An integrated automated management system enables communication between the commercial entity and the revenue office via encrypted General Packet Radio Service (GPRS).
Panama	Hardware-based.
Poland	
Romania	Beginning in October 2018, old devices were replaced with mandatory electronic fiscal devices with Internet connection capabilities. Various encryption methods enable digital signing of each issued receipt (via third-generation fiscal devices).
Russia	Beginning from mid-2017, a certified cash desk and certified secure storage with Internet connectivity were required for regular and online shopping. Cash desks are able to issue electronic documents containing transaction data, archive these transactions locally on certified secure storage, and report them in real-time (or no more than 30 days delay) to the Federal Tax Administration via a certified Fiscal Data Operator.
Rwanda	
Serbia	In 2004, the first country which introduced fiscal law with GPRS fiscal terminals.
Slovakia	Fiscalization started in 2008, with each fiscal device certified and registered by the government. Most of the fiscal memories are in modules attached to printers and can operate offline. It is also possible to operate online through a government website.
Slovenia	A cloud-based software-only solution has been present since 2016 and requires fiscal cash registers. Fiscalization in Slovenia is based on the online authorization of every fiscal relevant transaction created at POS, which communicates with the Slovenian Tax Authority which issues a unique code. That code and a QR code are printed on every receipt. If there is no Internet connection, the retailer must have each fiscal receipt authorized within 72 hours.
Spain	Electronic invoice adoption since 2015 for government bills only
Sweden	
Tanzania	Electronic Fiscal Devices implementation was announced on 2009 July and began use in 2010 to date. Tanzania was the only country in East Africa that started the use of EFDs with GPRS features since the beginning.
Venezuela	Fiscal printers began use in December 1999, with server communication protocols enacted in October 2018.
