= IBM Retail Store Systems =

Point of sale equipment made by IBM

This article describes IBM point of sale equipment from 1973 with the introduction of the IBM 3650 till 1986 with the introduction of the IBM 4680. IBM continued to announced new retail products until the sale of the IBM Retail Store Solutions business to Toshiba TEC, announced on 17 April 17 2012.

== Background ==
IBM began selling retail point of sale systems starting in 1973 with the IBM 3650 Retail Store System aimed at department and chain stores and the IBM 3660 Supermarket System designed for supermarkets. The IBM 3650 was announced alongside other IBM vertical industry systems such as the IBM 3600 Finance Communication System, and the IBM 3790 communications system, the combination of which IBM described as a "revolution in terminal based systems". All of these systems relied on a significant number of developments across IBM:

- New chips: Large Scale Integration allowed advanced Field Effect Transistor logic chips that packed far more transistors onto a new metalized one-inch square ceramic substrate
- Gas panels: Developed as an alternative to cathode ray tubes, the neon argon gas panel provided clear and flicker-free images.
- Modem communications: Synchronous Data Link Control provided lower-cost communications over telephone lines
- New disks: The "Gulliver" disk file that supplied a hard drive smaller than three cubic feet and also the "Igar" diskette drive
- Smaller printers: A disk printer system called "spica" that used a rotating disk print element with engraved print elements that are struck by a single hammer as the disk rotates
- Belt printers: A new system, known as "Lynx," using a removable belt that was significantly cheaper, quieter and simpler than earlier chain printers
- Keyboards: New keyboard technology called "Calico" that could build a wide variety of keyboards using common manufacturing facilities
- Power supplies: Transistorised Switching Regulators or TsRs: compact power supplies that are one third to one-fourth the size of previous generations

=== Store Loop (SLOOP) architecture ===
The 36xx retail terminals are connected to the store controller via a loop also called a Store Loop, similar to that used by the IBM 3600 Finance System. If a terminal detects an error, it runs a self-diagnosis routine, displays an error code to the operator, and uses bypass circuitry to remove itself from the loop and allow the loop to continue operating. If the loop fails, the most downstream terminal transmits an error code to the controller. Intermittent errors are written to disk on the store controller.

=== Supplies Manufacturing ===
While IBM's Data Processing Division created the retail store systems, it's Information Record Division (IRD) also saw signifiant opportunity in manufacturing supplies for retail systems. As an example in their Dayton, NJ plant they used a high-speed Webtron press to create up to 1 million magnet merchandise tags per shift.

== IBM 3650 Retail Store System ==
The 3650 System is a family of products designed to computerise a retail store, both at the point of sale and for back office store management functions. It includes a method to generate encoded tickets for merchandise, rather than use the Universal Product Code (UPC).

The key devices for the system were as follows:

=== Shop Floor ===
==== 3653 Point of Sale Terminal ====
Designed for the store floor, it is a loop attached device with:

- a wire matrix printer with 3 stations: cash receipt, sales-check and transaction journal.
- a keyboard with 10 numeric keys and 19 function keys
- an 8 digit display and description lights. in addition to the 8 digits it also displays the following characters: "$", "." and "-"
- operator guidance panel with 20 backlit captions
- status indicators
- a cash drawer
- a check verification station.

Options include a wand magnet label reader with a 4-foot flexible cord, and locks for the journal tape and the till cover. The terminal effectively loads its software remotely from the 3651 over the loop, which IBM calls an IML (initial microcode load). It can also be IMLed locally using a tape cassette recorder.

IBM later offered a choice of OEM wand attachments that could be ordered by RPQ that could use OCR or scan UPCs, instead of a wand magnet label reader. Only one wand could be attached to a specific 3653.

There are two models:

- Model 1, which is not programmable. Was announced 10 August 1973.
- Model P1, which is customer programmable. Has 36 KB of storage expandable to 60 KB. Was announced 13 October 1978.

=== Back office equipment ===
==== 3651 Store Controller ====
Controls data flow inside either a single store or multiple stores and sends retail transactions to a mainframe using a modem.

For point of sale it performed functions such as:

- Automatic price lookup from a master price file
- Automatic distribution of net sales by up to 54 departments
- Automatic application of applicable discounts and sales taxes
- Automatic control of food stamp maximums
- Check authorization facilities

For back office it also helped report preparation such as:

- store summary
- individual cashier performance
- store office reconciliation
- sales by up to 54 departments
- Current inquiries for department sales; cashier performance & cash position; store cash position.
- Inquiries and changes to the master price records and operator authorization control records.
- Setting the time and date for the internal clock.
- Running the customer checkouts in training mode.
- Printing of messages received from the host mainframe
- Entry of messages to send to the host mainframe
- Reporting of customer stock returns
- Updating the system with data received from the mainframe
- Preparing shelf Labels

Basic features include:

- Each loop attaches up to 63 or 64 terminals depending on traffic volumes and desired response times
- Has an error and operator panel.

There were many models including:

- A25 Has a 5 MB internal disk. Has 60K of memory expandable to 76KB. Supports one store loop. Attaches to 3275, 3653 and 3663. Announced 19 May 1978, withdrawn 19 February 1981
- B25 Same as a A25 with a 9.2 MB internal disk. Announced 19 May 1978
- C25 Announced 15 May 1981, withdrawn 15 December 1987
- A50 Has a 5 MB internal disk. Announced 5 May 1975. Announced 10 August 1973, withdrawn 15 December 1987
- B50 Same as B50 with a 9.2 MB internal disk. Announced 5 May 1975, withdrawn 15 December 1987
- A60 Has a 5 MB internal disk. Has an integrated 3669. Attaches up to 24 3663 terminals. Announced 11 October 1973, withdrawn 15 December 1987
- B60 Same as A60 with a 9.3 MB internal disk. Announced 17 November 1975, withdrawn 15 December 1987
- A75 Has 5 MB internal disk. Has 60K of memory expandable to 124KB. Supports one to three store loops. Attaches to 3275, 3653, 3657, 3784 and 3663 terminals. Announced 19 May 1978
- B75 Same as A75 with 9.3 MB internal disk. Announced 19 May 1978, withdrawn 15 December 1987
- C75 Same as A75 with 18.6 MB internal disk. Announced 19 May 1978, withdrawn 15 December 1987
- D75 Same as A75 with 27.9 MB internal disk. Announced 19 May 1978, withdrawn 15 December 1987

There were also two additional models that could be used instead of the 3651:

- 7480 Model 1: Has a 18.6 MB internal disk
- 7480 Model 2: Has a 27.9 MB internal disk

==== 3872 Modem ====
Used to attach to a 3659 for remote loops. Each 3872 can attach three 3659s.

==== 3659 Remote Communication Unit ====
Connected to an IBM 3872 and provides a remote loop for up to 64 point of sale terminals. Announced 10 August 1973, withdrawn 15 December 1987 (Model 2, announced 17 March 1976, withdrawn 20 December 1982)

Intended to be used in a back office location like the store manager's office or the data entry office

==== 3275-3 Display Station ====
It is a loop attached display terminal with printer attachment hardware

==== 3784 Line Printer ====
A belt printer for higher-volume end-of-day reporting. The maximum print speed is 155 Ipm using a 48 character set.

==== 3657 Ticket Unit ====
Used to print tickets and encoded labels to attach to store merchandise. It is a loop attached device. It prints the following:

- 1" by 1" adhesive backed labels with up to 11 characters at 500 tickets per minute. IBM sold these in rolls of 9000
- 1" x 2" tickets with up to 42 encoded characters and two lines of print of up to 21 characters at 250 tickets per minute. IBM sold these in rolls of 2800
- 1" x 3" tickets with up to 79 encoded characters and two lines of print of up to 32 characters at 167 tickets per minute. IBM sold these in rolls of 1900

It can also batch read the tickets for validation, separating good tickets from bad ones into two cartridges.

Announced 10 August 1973, withdrawn 15 December 1987

==== 7481 Data Storage Unit ====
This optional unit is used to record transaction data and initialize terminals if the store controller is not available. It uses a built in tape drive to store this data.

=== Early deployments ===
The first customer installation of a 3650 was at a Dillard's department store in Little Rock, Arkansas, in late 1974. They placed around 50 terminals across three floors. Expansions continued at other Dillard's stores as well as a J. C. Penney and in selected departments of B. Altman & Company in the New York area. By the end of 1974, nine stores were equipped with 3650 systems.

International uptake was also strong. By early 1976, Quelle, Germany's largest mail-order retailer, had begun installing the 3650 across all 23 of its stores, with 100 terminals already in operation and a further 500 on order. Galeries Lafayette in Paris signed for 400 terminals; Spanish chain Galerías Preciados and Australian department store Grace Brothers also placed orders.

In July 1976, B. Altman & Company became the first department store in the United States to equip its entire chain with the IBM 3650 Retail Store System. This totalled close to 525 terminals across five branches, around 180 of them in the Fifth Avenue flagship store. These were connected to two System/370 Model 135 processors.

== IBM 3660 Supermarket System ==
IBM announced the 3660 Supermarket System on 11 October 1973, with first deliveries aimed for the third quarter of 1974. The 3660 System is designed to computerise supermarket point of sale. It consists of checkout terminals as well as back office equipment for store management.

Note that while IBM was heavily involved in the development of the UPC, the first retail purchase using the UPC (for a packet of Wrigley's chewing gum), was actually performed on an NCR register with a Spectra Physics model A price scanner.

The key devices for the IBM 3660 System were as follows:

=== Shop Floor ===
==== 3663 Supermarket Terminal ====
There were multiple models:

- Model 1: Station with control hardware for one station. Has a printer, display, keyboard and cash drawer. Announced 11 October 1973 and withdrawn 20 December 1983
- Model 1P: Station with control hardware for one station.. Has a printer, display, keyboard and cash drawer. Announced 30 June 1978 and withdrawn 2 August 1983.
- Model 2: Station only, attaches to a model 1 for control functions. Has a printer, display, keyboard and cash drawer. Announced 11 October 1973 and withdrawn 20 December 1983
- Model 3: Control hardware only. Attaches to 1–3 model 2s. Announced 8 November 1976 and withdrawn 20 December 1983
- Model 3P: Control hardware only. Attaches to 1–3 model 2s. Announced 30 June 1978 and withdrawn 2 August 1983.

Each terminal station has:

- a keyboard with 10 numeric keys plus function keys
- printer with two print locations using a radial printing technique. Tape one is the customer receipt printing at 80 lpm while tape 2 is the transaction journal printing at 35 lpm. It can also print 3–4 shelf labels per minute. An optional document printing function could be added
- display with 22 alphanumeric characters
- cash drawer with removable and lockable till with 5 note compartments and 5 coin compartments

==== Checkout Scanners ====
These would be placed in each checkout lane and attached to a 3663 or the later 3659. IBM described the scanners as fixed head optical readers. They both used a window which the customer had to replace if it became scratched.

- 3666 (model 1): Used optical recognition to read a UPC barcode using a laser beam, eliminating most of the manual key entry normally associated with point of sale.

Announced 11 October 1973; withdrawn 30 June 1980.

- 3667 (model 1): announced 8 November 1976; withdrawn 20 December 1983.

=== Back Office ===
==== 3661 Store Controller ====
Manages data flow in the store, normally located in a back office room.

- Communicated with a mainframe using a 3669 or 3976-3 or other modem.
- Can have two store loops and each loop can have 12 x 3663s or 18 by adding an additional 8 KB of storage
- Has a CE and an operator panel

There were several models:

- Model 1: Has a single sided diskette drive. Announced 11 October 1973, withdrawn 5 March 1982
- Model 2: Has a double sided diskette drive. Announced 8 November 1976, withdrawn 5 March 1982
- Model B60: Announced 17 November 1975.

For checkout operations it performed functions such as:

- Automatic price lookup from a master price file, either 250 items or 1275 items with an additional 8 KB of storage
- Automatic distribution of net sales by department
- Automatic application of applicable discounts and sales taxes
- Automatic control of food stamp maximums
- Check verification facilities

For back office it also helped report preparation such as:

- store summary
- individual cashier performance
- store office reconciliation
- sales by up to 9 departments
- Current inquiries for department sales; cashier performance & cash position; store cash position.
- Maintenance to the master price file, check verification file and operator authorization file
- Setting the date and time for the internal clock.
- Running the customer checkouts in training mode.
- Printing of messages received from the host mainframe
- Entry of messages to send to the host mainframe
- Reporting of customer stock returns
- Updating the system with data received from the mainframe
- Preparing shelf Labels

==== 3669 Store Communications Unit ====
Connects the 3651 to the store's central mainframe:

- Model 1 – Switched Line Unit (Canada)
- Model 2 – Caducee Line Unit (France)
- Model 3 – Non-switched Line3

Announced 11 October 1973; withdrawn 15 December 1987

=== Early deployments ===
One of the first installations was 12 registers at a Steinberg's supermarket in Dorval, Quebec, in July 1974. Steinberg's subsequently ordered three additional systems in 1975. Some of the issues seen during that first install included:

- Most merchandise did not have UPC codes, so Steinberg's staff had to glue UPC stickers on around 250 different product lines.
- Customers had to be educated on the fact that these items did not have price tags on them and a complete store price list was published so customers could check them. Grease pencils were offered to customers who wished to manually write the price on each item. Steinberg's also offered a scanning terminal that customers could use to become familiar with the new technology.
- Customers reported the display on the checkout station was hard to read (which IBM said they would remedy in a new design) and advanced too fast for to read because of the rate that the cashier could scan items
- There was a concern that sunlight may affect scanning, although this was discounted at the time
- Credit card payment could not be accepted

By the end of that year, approximately 15 systems were in operation or in customer test.

The lack of price tags did result in legal action against supermarket Purity Supreme in 1977. They were challenged in Massachusetts Middlesex Superior Court as to the legality of not printing prices on each individual stock item as part of their adoption of the 3660 system.

== IBM 3680 Programmable Store System ==
IBM's Data Processing Division announced the 3680 Programmable Store System on 8 January 1979. Targeted at retailers with multiple smaller stores, and designed to be operated by retail staff with minimal technical training.

=== Shop floor components ===
There were a variety of shop floor components:

==== IBM 3683 Point of Sale Terminal (Model 001) ====
This terminal features the following:

- a numeric keypad
- a variety of keyboard offerings including 35 and 48 keys
- a one or two sided display. Display one has an 8 digit display with 32 indicator lights. Display two if ordered is customer facing with an 8 digit display and 6 indicators
- function keys for transaction types
- eight-digit LED display
- a choice of two wand readers, either magnetic or OCR
- a bidirectional printer that can have up to three print stations

The cashier would enter an item being sold by typing an eight-digit SKU code consisting of a three-digit class number, a four-digit item number, and a check digit. The 3683 with keyboard, display and cash drawer was priced at $3,225; with diskette, $3,950. First deliveries were scheduled for February 1980. Later models A01, A02, 003 and A03 were announced on 19 November 1980. All models were withdrawn 15 December 1987.

==== IBM 3686 Display Station ====
Model 1 was announced 15 May 1981.

==== IBM 3687 Checkout Scanner ====
This is a third-generation scanning unit for the 36xx family and the Model 1 was announced 19 November 1980. The Model 2 was announced 3 May 1985.

=== Back office components ===
For the back office a number of control units were released:

==== IBM 3684 Point of Sale Control Unit (Models 1 and 2) ====
The store controller that manages the terminal network, storing transaction data, and communicating with the retailer's System/370 mainframe. It includes a 985,088 byte double sided diskette drive for application programs, transaction logs and reports.

- Model 1: Single unit for a single store with 56 KB of memory
- Model 2: Master unit for multiple stores with 56 KB plus 32 KB of memory for each store
- Built in printer
- Options for an integrated modem or external modem
- Option for a disk pack

Announced 8 January 1979; both models were withdrawn 15 December 1987.

==== IBM 3685 Display Control Unit (Models 1 and 2) ====
Announced 15 May 1981

==== IBM 3689 Store Communications Unit ====
The IBM 3689 Store Communications Unit Model 1 was announced on 15 April 1981, providing an updated controller for the 3680 system; it was withdrawn 15 December 1987.

== IBM 5260 Retail System ==
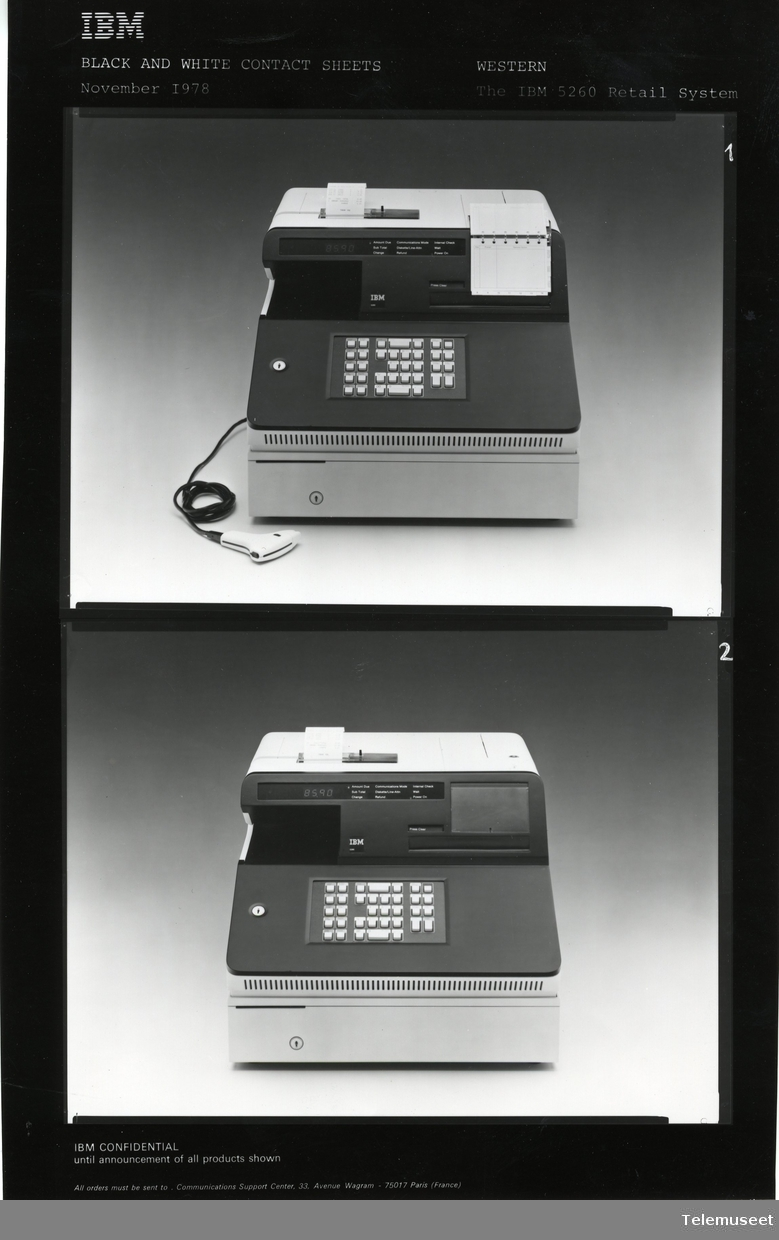
IBM 5260 retail system prototypes

IBM's General Systems Division announced the 5260 Retail System on 8 January 1979, at the same time as the 3680. The decision by two divisions of IBM to offer differing retail solutions was considered surprising.

The 5260 is aimed at smaller stores that can not justify the cost or complexity of a mainframe-connected system. It uses standalone registers built around the IBM 5265 Point of Sale Terminal, with transaction data stored on 8-inch floppy disks that can be physically removed and processed on a back-office computer. The 5265 can operate as a standalone unit or in a cluster of up to ten terminals. Functions can be tailored by completing a personalisation questionnaire, with answers entered on the 5265 keyboard using a special keyboard overlay. The system includes an 80-character bidirectional printer for sales slips and cash receipts.

An option exists to network multiple 5265 terminals together via Binary Synchronous Communications (Bisync), with the transaction log transmitted to IBM mini-computer systems like the System/34, System/32 or System/3. Transaction data from the terminal could also be copied directly from the registers diskette. Programming was performed directly at the register using paper keyboard overlays, without requiring any connection to a central system for basic operation.

Three licensed application programs were available: the Retail Merchandise and Audit System (RMAS), covering data preparation, sales audit and merchandise control, at $65, $130 and $200 per month respectively. A System/370 Retail Data Preparation program followed in February 1980 at $85 per month. A standalone 5260 system with diskette terminal, keyboard and cash drawer was priced at $3,850, or $131 per month on a three-year lease. First deliveries were scheduled for September 1979.

The 5265 Point of Sale Terminal and its companion 5266 unit were both withdrawn from marketing on 16 April 1986, shortly after the IBM 4680 Store System was announced in January of that year.

== IBM 4680 Store System ==
On 8 January 1986 IBM announced the 4680 Store System. A major change is that rather than use a custom device, the store controller is a variant of IBM PC AT which can manage up to 128 of their new modular IBM 4683 terminals, consisting of 64 Model 1s and 64 Model 2s.

=== Controllers ===
The controllers came in at least two models:

- IBM 5170 PC AT Model 899 with either one or two 20-megabyte hard drives with prices starting at $9,120
- IBM 5170 PC AT Model 839 with either one or two 30-megabyte hard drives with prices starting at $9,320

They ran the IBM 4680 operating system, a variant of PC-DOS.

IBM later supported the use of a PS/2 as a store controller, running the 4680 Operating System Version 2, 3 and 4. They offered a microchannel store loop adapter that ran at 38,400 bits per second.

=== Point of sale terminals ===
There were many models of the IBM 4683 point of sale terminal:

- Model 1: announced 8 January 1986. A primary terminal that could manage a single model 2.
- Model 2 :announced 8 January 1986. A satellite terminal that attached to a model 1.
- Model A01: announced 15 December 1987. A primary terminal
- Model A02: announced 15 December 1987
- Model P11: A primary terminal
- Model P21: A primary terminal
- Model P41: A primary terminal

The IBM 4683 has a lockable cash drawer and the ability to check credit card validity, display item prices and descriptions, and record transactions electronically.

=== Example customers ===
- The first customer was a Sam’s Club located on Getwell Road in Memphis, TN.
- In 1988 McRae's fashion department store located in four southern United States, stated in an job listing that they were installing over 1200 IBM 4683 POS terminals in 28 remote locations.
- In 1993 American hypermarket Fred Meyer reported that all stores were running the 4680 system.

== Technical significance ==
The IBM 3650 and 3660 store systems are cited as among the earliest commercial deployments of several technologies that later became industry standards:

- 'Client–server architecture': the store controller acting as a shared server to a network of client terminals distributed across the store floor.
- Local area network (LAN): the in-store SLOOP constituted a shared-medium network with addressable nodes, fault bypass circuitry, and automatic error reporting.
- Remote initialisation: terminals could be loaded with updated pricing and application programs from the mainframe over telephone lines, without requiring on-site intervention.
- Simultaneous backup: the SLOOP design allowed continuous logging to backup storage and cross-store failover via the 3659 or 3669 communications units.

== See also ==
- IBM Personal Computer AT
- Point of sale
- Universal Product Code
- Systems Network Architecture
