= PoweredUSB =

Proprietary extension to the USB standard

- Logo of the standard
- Status: Published
- First published: 28 January 1998
- Latest version: 0.8g 2004
- Organization: www.PoweredUSB.org
- Related standards: USB, viz. USB 1.1 and USB 2.0
- Domain: Power delivery
- Website: www.poweredusb.org

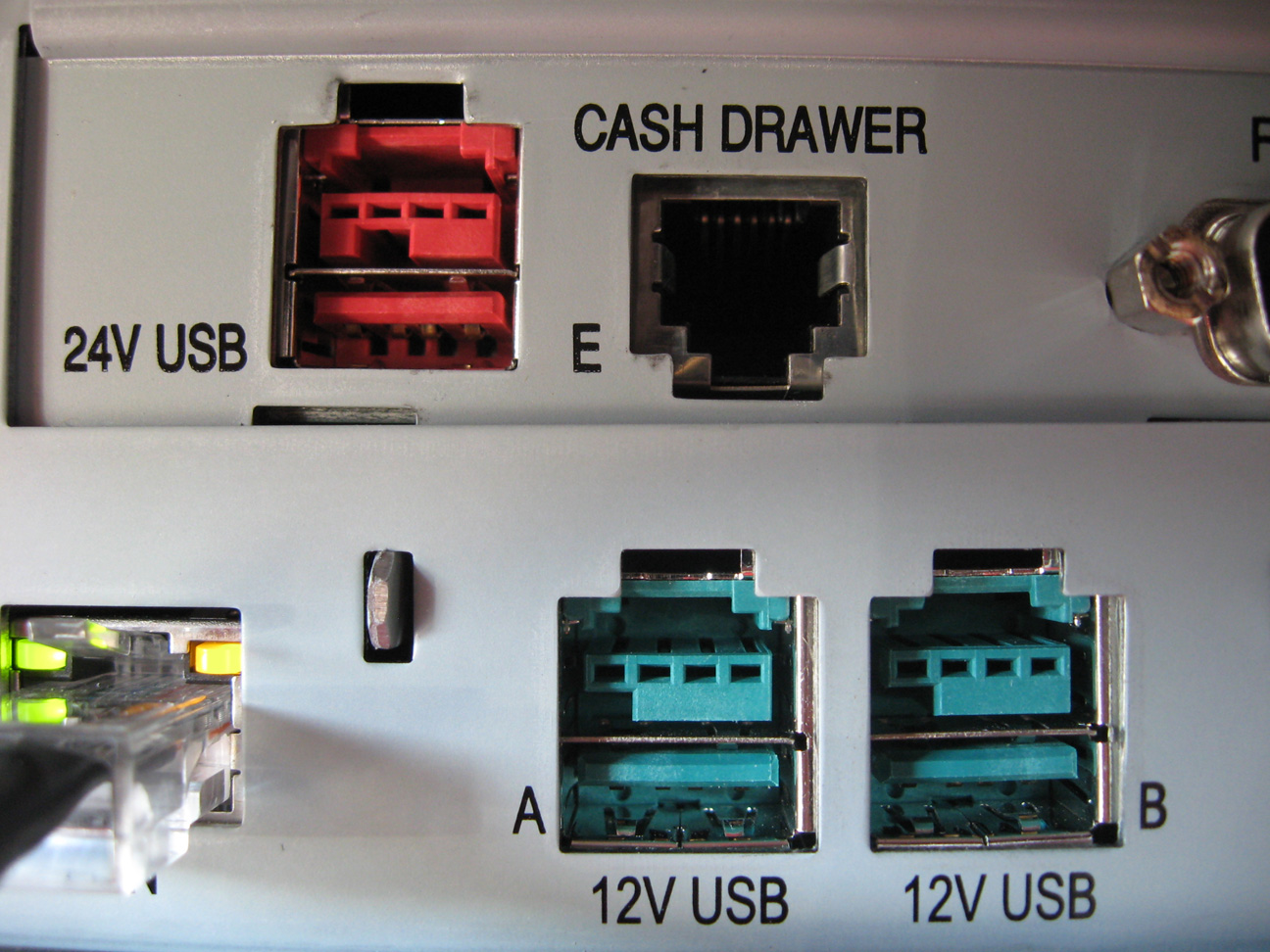
12 V and 24 V powered USB sockets, on an NCR cash register

PoweredUSB, also known as Retail USB, USB PlusPower, USB +Power, and USB Power Plus, is an addition to the Universal Serial Bus standard that allows for higher-power devices to obtain power through their USB host instead of requiring an independent power supply or external AC adapter. It is mostly used in point-of-sale equipment, such as receipt printers, touch screens and barcode readers.

== History ==
PoweredUSB, as a proprietary variant of USB, was developed and proposed by IBM, Berg Electronics (now a subsidiary of Amphenol), NCR Corporation, and Microsoft between 1998 and 1999, with the last revision (0.8g) issued in 2004. The specification is not endorsed by the USB Implementers Forum (USB-IF). IBM, who owns patents to PoweredUSB, charges a licensing fee to manufacturers for its use.

PoweredUSB was licensed by Hewlett-Packard, Toshiba, Epson, Fujitsu, Wincor-Nixdorf, Siemens, among others.

== Implementation ==
PoweredUSB uses a more complex connector than standard USB, maintaining the standard connector of USB 1.x and USB 2.0 interface for data communications and adding a second connector for power. Physically, it is essentially two connectors stacked such that the bottom connector accepts a standard USB plug and the top connector takes a power plug.

The implementation allows a choice of three different voltages, providing power at 5 V (30 W), 12 V (72 W), 24 V (144 W) as well as a custom voltage. Some implementations provide 19 V or 25 V. The connectors are able to operate at up to 6 A (3 A per pin) peak, but according to the specification, hosts are required to provide a minimum sustainable rms current of 1.5 A at 5 V (7.5 W) or 12 V (18 W), or 2.3 A at 24 V (55.2 W), only.

For comparison, a standard USB 1.x and 2.0 hosts supplies 5 V at up to 0.5 A (2.5 W). USB 3.0 supplies 5 V at up to 0.9 A (4.5 W) whereas hosts conformant to the USB Battery Charging Specification can deliver up to 1.5 A (7.5 W).

As each PoweredUSB plug provides one of three voltages, the plugs come keyed in three versions, so that they will only accept connections from devices requiring that version's voltage. The connectors can be color-coded for different voltages: Gray (Pantone Cool Gray 1C) (sometimes also "nature" or yellow) for 5 V, blue-green (Pantone Teal 3262C) for 12 V, red (Pantone Red 032C) for 24 V/25 V and violet for 19 V; alternatively, any voltages higher than 5 V can be indicated by a black connector color.

The connectors, available from various manufacturers, provide an auto-locking facility to reduce the risk of accidental power failures. Special provisions for hot-plugging are recommended, but optional. The red 24 volt plugs should never be plugged in or removed with the unit powered on.

== Future ==
In 2012, the USB-IF released the USB Power Delivery Specification (USB PD) as an optional part of the USB 2.0 and 3.x specifications. It defines features similar to those addressed by PoweredUSB, but using just a standard USB-C port and cable. Higher currents require PD-aware USB-cables, though. USB hosts compliant with this USB specification can be requested by USB devices to provide alternative voltages (9, 15 and 20 V) and higher currents – up to 3 A at 5 V (for a power consumption of up to 15 W) and optionally up to 5 A at either 12 V (60 W) or 20 V (100 W).

== See also ==
- IBM Retail Store Solutions, the business unit for POS software and hardware within IBM
