= Serial Digital Video Out =

Proprietary Intel technology

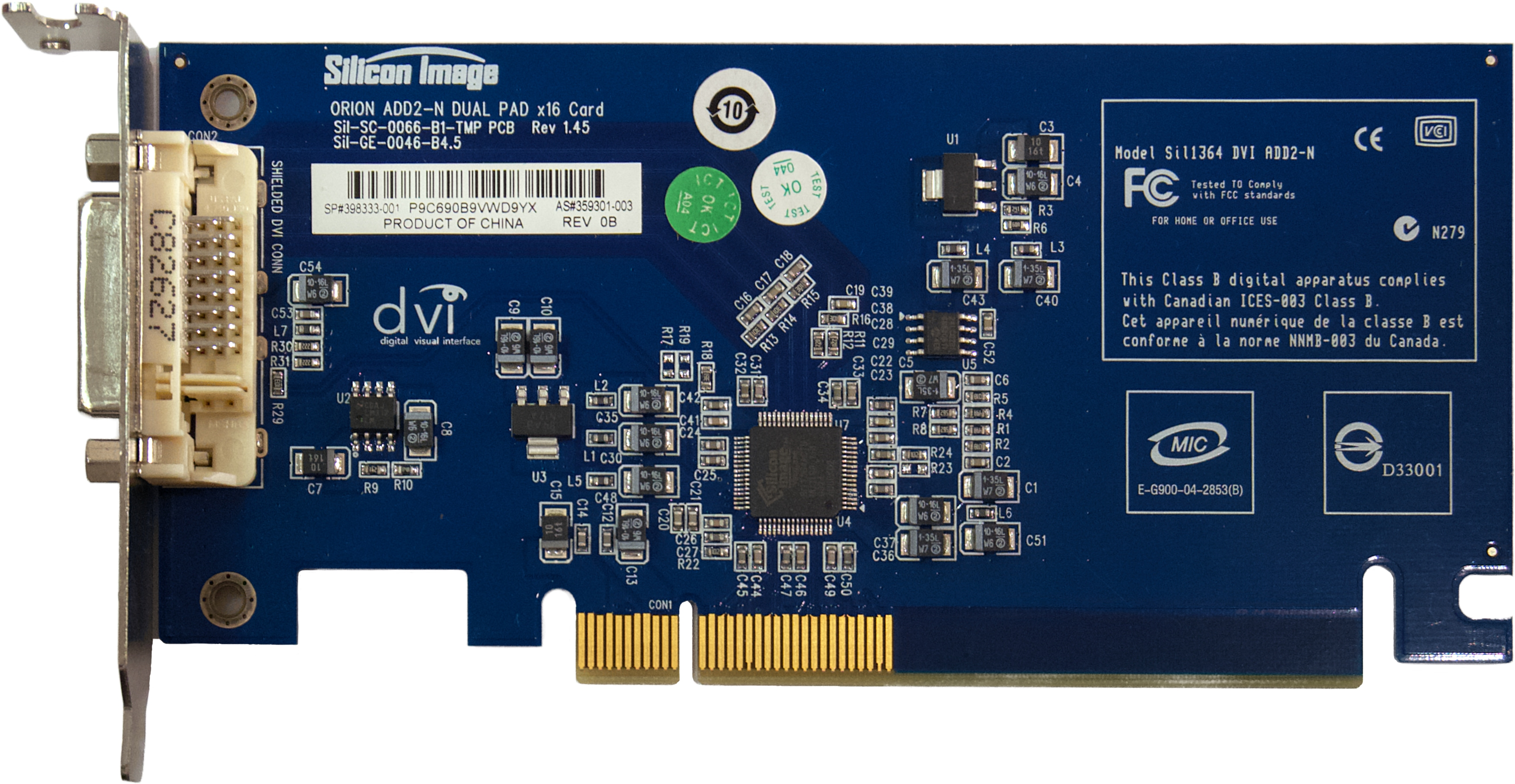
Silicon Image Sil1364 DVI-D ADD2 PCIe card

Serial Digital Video Out (SDVO) is a proprietary Intel technology introduced with their 9xx-series of motherboard chipsets.

SDVO makes it possible to use a 16-lane PCI express slot to add additional video signalling interfaces such as VGA and DVI monitor outputs, SDTV and HDTV television outputs, or TV tuner inputs to a system board containing an integrated Intel 9xx-series graphics processor.

SDVO adaptor cards are variously designated as ADD2 (advanced digital display, second generation) or the more feature-rich MEC (media expansion card). MEC is sometimes designated as ADD2+ in Intel documents.

Intel often refers to SDVO as Serial DVO to distinguish it from other forms of digital video out associated with prior product generations, such as the AGP implementation of DVO and older AGP-style ADD expansion cards which are not SDVO compatible.

== Proprietary status ==
Intel's non-standard extension of the PCI express interface is subject to a patent application Mapping SDVO functions from PCI express interface (United States Application 20050172037) filed on 12 December 2003.

According to the Intel patent application, the PCI Express standard lacks a "mechanism to make use of a digital display codec using the PCI Express connector." This limitation is attributed to PCI Express defining only a fixed-frequency interface with significant packet encoding overheads, whereas "digital displays need to have variable clocking and transfer rates and need very little overhead for the transfer of video data".

The patent relates a "presence detect" mechanism to detect SDVO-type expansion cards and enable a pin-remapping of the PCI Express socket to convey SDVO signals.

As of January 2007, Intel has not publicly documented an intent to promote SDVO as an industry standard, despite its potential applicability to any PCI express platform with an Integrated Graphics Processor (IGP), or the desirability from the consumer perspective that SDVO adaptor cards be compatible and freely interchangeable among all such systems.

Instead, Intel is actively promoting the development of SDVO drivers across the broad range of operating systems which run on the Intel 9xx platform. In particular, Intel has established the website intellinuxgraphics.org to promote fully open sourced drivers supporting all video technologies embodied in their 9xx-series platform.

The upshot is that SDVO cards are compatible with a narrow range of Intel-only hardware platforms, but a broad range of software environments within that platform.

== Applications ==
SDVO encoders can be integrated into the motherboard or placed on a PCI express card, allowing video connectors to be added or exchanged at low cost. SDVO adaptor cards can be designed for the following purposes (from Intel ADD2 quoted verbatim):

- Dual DVI: dual independent DVI displays
- TV-out (Composite): primary or secondary TV-out display (standard definition in PAL or NTSC formats)
- HDTV-Out: primary or secondary HDTV display
- VGA-Out: drive second RGB independent display
- DVI: primary or secondary DVI display
- LVDS: LVDS interface for integrated flat panel

== ADD and MEC form factors ==
SDVO adaptor cards are designated as ADD (advanced digital display) or MEC (media expansion card) or the equivalent ADD2+.

Older ADD cards were AGP-based and did not provide a standard interface, posing difficulties for driver development. The second generation ADD2 cards are PCI express and employ a standard interface. There are, however, two distinct flavours of ADD2 cards: ADD2-N (normal) and ADD2-R (reverse). "Normal cards use the first channels on the PCI-E connector while Reverse cards use the last channels." The ADD2-N cards are reported to work without fuss under Linux with Intel chipsets ranging from the 915 through to the 965.

A different source claims that ADD2-N are for ATX form-factor systems while ADD2-R is for BTX form-factor systems. However, some BTX systems require ADD2-N (e.g. HP dc5700), so you will have to consult your system documentation.

According to Reseller Advocate (RAM magazine) a Media Expansion Card (MEC) is "an x16 PCIe card with an SDVO silicon module for VGA, DVI, S-Video, composite, or component output combined with an x1 PCIe analog TV tuner" introduced as a "945G platform add-on descended from the old ADD and ADD2 cards."

The application note for the 945G describes the SDVO card interface as requiring a full x16 PCI-E slot.

== Intel chipsets supporting SDVO ==
Intel documents SDVO as existing within the chipsets integrating an Intel Graphics Media Accelerator (GMA 900 through 3000 families).

== GMA X3000 ==
The Intel G965 series chipsets implement the GMA X3000 graphics controller, the consumer engine of the Intel Graphics Media Accelerator 3000 family. From the Intel Desktop board DG965RY Technical Product Specification, section 1.5.1.4 "Advanced Digital Display (ADD2/ADD2+) Card Support":

The GMCH routes two multiplexed SDVO ports that are each capable of driving up to a 200 MHz pixel clock to the PCI Express x16 connector. The SDVO ports can be paired for a dual channel configuration to support up to a 400 MHz pixel clock. When an ADD2/ADD2+ card is detected, the Intel GMA X3000 graphics controller is enabled and the PCI Express x16 connector is configured for SDVO mode. SDVO mode enables the SDVO ports to be accessed by the ADD2/ADD2+ card. An ADD2/ADD2+ card can either be configured to support simultaneous display with the primary VGA display or can be configured to support dual independent display as an extended desktop configuration with different color depths and resolutions.

This chipset allows the ADD2/MEC design to support TV-out (composite video), TMDS for DVI 1.0, LVDS, single device operating in dual-channel mode, VGA output, HDTV output, HDMI/UDI support (when used with the HD Audio Link).
