= AMD XGP =

AMD XGP (eXternal Graphics Platform) is a brand for an external graphics solution for laptops and notebooks by AMD. The technology was announced on June 4, 2008, on Computex 08 trade show, following the announcement of the codenamed Puma notebook platform.

== Development ==
Originally reported by Hexus.net as a side project to the R600 series graphics cards, the project, Codenamed Lasso, was an external graphics solution using desktop video cards, with data sent via two cables as defined in PCI-E external cabling specification (version 1.0). The project later fell into development hell, with its status remaining unknown. In June 2008, near Computex 2008, rumours surfaced on the Internet about AMD was preparing an external graphics solution for notebook computers but using a proprietary connectivity solution instead. The ATI XGP was officially announced on June 4, 2008, during the Computex 2008 exhibition.

== Technology ==
The XGP platform consists of several parts, that includes a mobility Radeon HD graphics card, an external case and a proprietary connectivity solution.

=== Graphics ===
- Single GPU configuration
  - Mobility Radeon HD 3870 (M88 core)
    - AVIVO HD with UVD
    - Integrated HDCP
  - Mobility Radeon HD 5870 (Broadway core)
- ATI Crossfire X technology (Dual GPU configuration)
  - Mobility Radeon HD 3850 X2
  - Mobility Radeon HD 3870 X2

=== Connectivity ===
==== Data ====
- Proprietary connectivity solution designed in collaboration with JAE Electronics
  - Transfer PCI-E 2.0 signals between XGP and the notebook computer
  - PCI Express 2.0 compliant
  - 8 lanes and 16 lanes option available
  - Hot plug detection
  - AMD has one year exclusivity on the use of the connector
- 2 USB 2.0
  - For connecting external disc players
  - Connected via the signal pairs between the southbridge to the USB hub via the cable

==== Visual ====
- Supports up to four displays via the following visual outputs:
  - DVI-I
  - HDMI
  - Optional DisplayPort

== Consumer products ==
=== Laptop ===
- Fujitsu-Siemens Amilo Sa 3650
- Acer Ferrari One 200

=== Enclosure/dock ===
- Fujitsu-Siemens AMILO GraphicBooster
- Acer DynaVivid
