= FeaturePak =

The FeaturePak standard defines a small form factor card for I/O expansion of embedded systems and other space-constrained computing applications. The cards are intended to be used for adding a wide range of capabilities, such as A/D, D/A, digital I/O, counter/timers, serial I/O, wired or wireless networking, image processing, GPS, etc. to their host systems.

FeaturePak cards plug into edgecard sockets, parallel to the mainboard, similarly to how SO-DIMM memory modules install in laptop or desktop PCs.

== Socket Interface ==
The FeaturePak socket consists of a 230-pin "MXM" connector, which provides all connections to the FeaturePak card, including the host interface, external I/O signals, and power. (Note, however, that the FeaturePak specification's use of the MXM connector differs from that of Nvidia's MXM specification.)

Host interface connections include:

- PCI Express -- up to two PCI Express x1 lanes
- USB -- up to two USB 1.1 or 2.0 channels
- Serial—one logic-level UART interface
- SMBus
- JTAG
- PCI Express Reset
- Several auxiliary signals
- 3V and 5V power and ground
- Reserved lines (for future enhancements)

The balance of the 230-pin FeaturePak socket is allocated to I/O, in two groups:

- Primary I/O—50 general purpose I/O lines, of which 34 pairs have enhanced isolation
- Secondary I/O—50 general purpose I/O lines

The FeaturePak socket's MXM connector is claimed capable of 2.5 Gbit/s bandwidth on each pin, thereby supporting high-speed interfaces such as PCI Express, gigabit Ethernet, USB 2.0, among others. Enhanced I/O signal isolation within the Primary I/O group is accomplished by leaving alternate pins on the MXM connector interface unused.

FeaturePak cards are powered by 3.3V and use standard 3.3V logic levels. The socket also provides a 5V input option, for cards that require the additional voltage to power auxiliary functions.

Other than the provision of extra isolation for 34 signal pairs, there is no defined allocation of the signals within the Primary I/O and Secondary I/O groups, leaving each FeaturePak to define its own utilization of the I/O signals. Consequently, there is little limitation as to what can be implemented on a FeaturePak card.

== Card size ==
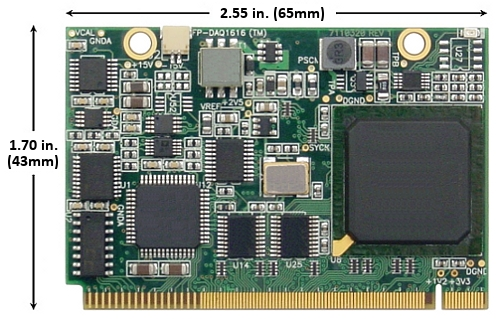
FeaturePak Module Dimensions

Overall FeaturePak horizontal dimensions are 1.75 x 2.55 inches (43 x 65 mm). There are two options for topside component thickness: "tall" FeaturePak modules may have topside components of up to 0.4 inch (10 mm) thick; "standard" modules are limited to 0.19 inch (4.8 mm) topside component thickness.

== History ==
The FeaturePak standard was launched by the FeaturePak Initiative at Embedded World 2010 in Nuremberg, Germany, in March 2010. At launch, the Initiative consisted of FeaturePak originator Diamond Systems, plus FeaturePak Initiative charter members Arbor Technology, Cogent Computer Systems, congatec, Connect Tech, Douglas Electronics, Hectronic, and IXXAT Automation.

The FeaturePak Initiative subsequently was superseded by a California nonprofit corporation known as the FeaturePak Trade Association (FPTA), which assumed ownership of the FeaturePak specification and other IP (intellectual property) and became responsible for maintaining, extending, and promoting the FeaturePak standard and established restrictions and guidelines pertaining to the use of the FeaturePak trademark and logos.

== Openness ==
The FeaturePak specification is freely available by application on the FeaturePak Trade Association's website. As stated on FeaturePak.org, "You need not join the FPTA or be otherwise licensed, in order to develop or manufacture products based on or incorporating FPTA specifications. However, use of FPTA-owned logos is restricted to FPTA members in good standing or to those explicitly licensed by the FPTA to use them. Please contact the FPTA for details regarding non-member licensing of FPTA logos."
