= XG Station =

Device to provide external GPU power to laptops

The ASUS XG Station is a device designed to provide external graphics processing power to laptops. It connects to a laptop though an ExpressCard slot. It requires a separate monitor as well as its own power source.

It includes USB 2.0 ports, a headphone jack, and a large knob used to control various settings such as overclocking. The screen tells the user information such as the GPU's clock and memory speeds, fan speeds, temperature, master volume, and FPS. From available photos it would appear that it will also provide dual DVI output connectors.

Since XG station uses the Express Card interface, actual bandwidth available to the card will be approximately PCI-E 1.1 x1 bandwidth.

The XG Station was featured at the 2007 Consumer Electronics Show.

The XG Station was scheduled to be released at the beginning of Q2 2007. A full package will include the XG Station graphics docking station, one ASUS EN7900GS graphics card and assorted accessories according to Asus News. The EN7900GS graphics card is an Nvidia GeForce 7900 according to an article from the Inquirer, and can be swapped out for another one. A January 2008 publication renewed speculation that the device was approaching production, and the XG Station reached limited release in May 2008.

In early 2008, the XG Station was only made available in Australia. It consisted of an NVIDIA GeForce 8600GT with 256MB DDR3 for approximately A$375.
