= PCI-SIG =

Electronics industry standards body

- Formation: 1992; 34 years ago (as PCI Special Interest Group) 2000; 26 years ago (as nonprofit)
- Type: Nonprofit
- Headquarters: Beaverton, Oregon, U.S.
- Products: PCI; PCI-X; PCI Express
- Members: 800+ companies incl.: AMD; Apple; ARM; Dell EMC; IBM; Intel; Synopsys; Keysight; Nvidia; Qualcomm
- Chairman and President: Al Yanes
- Executive Director: Reen Presnell
- Website: pcisig.com

PCI-SIG, or Peripheral Component Interconnect Special Interest Group, is an electronics industry consortium responsible for specifying the Peripheral Component Interconnect (PCI), PCI-X, and PCI Express (PCIe) computer buses. It is based in Beaverton, Oregon. The PCI-SIG is distinct from the similarly named and adjacently-focused PCI Industrial Computer Manufacturers Group.

It has produced the PCI, PCI-X and PCI Express specifications.

As of 2024, the board of directors of the PCI-SIG has representatives from: AMD, ARM, Dell EMC, IBM, Intel, Synopsys, Keysight, NVIDIA, and Qualcomm. The chairman and president of the PCI-SIG is Al Yanes, a "Distinguished Engineer" from IBM. The executive director of the PCI-SIG is Reen Presnell, president of VTM Group (an association management company).

== Formation ==
The PCI Special Interest Group was formed in 1992, initially as a "compliance program" to help computer manufacturers implement the Intel specification. The organization became a nonprofit corporation, officially named "PCI-SIG" in the year 2000.

== Membership ==
Membership of PCI-SIG is open to all of the microcomputer industry with a $5,000 annual fee. PCI-SIG has a membership of over 800 companies that develop differentiated, interoperable products based on its specifications. PCI-SIG specifications are available to members of the organization as free downloads. Non-members can purchase hard-copy specifications.

== See also ==
- PICMG
