= External storage =

Data storage outside a computer's own hardware

In computing, external storage refers to non-volatile (secondary) data storage outside a computer's own internal hardware, and thus can be readily disconnected and accessed elsewhere. Such storage devices may refer to removable media (e.g. punched paper, magnetic tape, floppy disk and optical disc), compact flash drives (USB flash drive and memory card), portable storage devices (external solid-state drive and enclosed hard disk drive), or network-attached storage. Web-based cloud storage is the latest technology for external storage. In recent years, analysts have noted that the rapid growth of cloud-based external storage has shifted emphasis from physical media toward distributed, service-based architectures used by both consumers and enterprises.

== History ==
Today the term external storage most commonly applies to those storage devices external to a personal computer. The terms refer to any storage external to the computer.

Storage as distinct from memory in the early days of computing was always external to the computer as for example in the punched card devices and media. Today storage devices may be internal or external to a computer system.

In the 1950s, introduction of magnetic tapes and hard disk drives allowed for mass external storage of information, which played the key part of the computer revolution. Initially all external storage, tape and hard disk drives are today available as both internal and external storage.

In the 1964 removable disk media was introduced by the IBM 2310 disk drive with its 2315 cartridge used in IBM 1800 and IBM 1130 computers. Magnetic disk media is today not removable; however disk devices and media such as optical disc drives and optical discs are available both as internal storage and external storage.

== Earlier adoption of external storage ==
As a consequence of rapid development of electronic computers, capability for integration of existing input, output, and storage devices was a determinant factor in their adoption. IBM 650 was a first mass-produced electronic computer that encompassed wide range of existing in technologies for input-output and memory devices, and it also included tape-to-card and card-to-tape conversion units. Earlier "transportable personal storage" was introduced by IBM's 2315 disk cartridges, which were used in IBM 1800 and IBM 1130 computers. Operating systems of the earlier 1960s provided a general-purpose file system for external storage, which included hierarchical directories, symbolic links, and access control to time-sharing mainframe computers. Some of such earlier examples include UNIVAC, MULTICS, and UNIX.

== Types of external storage ==
=== Paper data storage ===
- Punched tape
- Punched card

=== Magnetic storage ===
- Magnetic tape
- Floppy disk
- External hard disk drives

=== Optical storage ===
Optical storage devices have media that use laser light technology for data storage and retrieval.

==== Compact disc ====
Types of Compact Discs (CDs) include:

- CD-ROM: (Compact Disc Read Only Memory) It can only be read through the drive. And are usually manufactured by in bulk by a stamp type system.
- CD-R: (Compact Disc Recordable) was invented in the 1990s. Using CD-R, it is possible to write data once on a disc at home without the stamping equipment required for CD-ROMs. These are considered write once, read many disks.
- CD-RW: (Compact Disc Re-Writable) same as the CD-R but can be erased and reused. There is a limit on how many times a CD-RW can be written. Presently this limit is 1,000 times. CD-RW drives are compatible with CD-ROM and CD-R.

==== DVD ====
DVD stands for Digital Versatile Disc. Its speed is much faster than CD but not as fast as hard disk. The standard DVD-5 technology has a storage capacity of 4.7 GB per layer; most DVDs have a single layer but up to four layers are specified. Also DVD storage capacity changes with recording format.

==== Blu-ray ====
Blu-ray storage capacity is up to 50 gigabytes (or even 100 GB) of data. The Blu-ray Disc (BD) is a digital optical disc format. It was originally created to take the place of the DVD format due to its expanded storage capacity. The name "Blu-ray" is derived from the use of a blue laser that is used to read the disc. This would be in contrast to the red laser used to read DVD Discs.

==== HD DVD ====
HD DVD are the first publicly available digital storage format that was designed to handle HD video content up to 1080p. It was developed by Toshiba to compete with Blu-ray to be the standard for physical storage going forward. Two types of discs were released to the public, single-layer discs that could store 15 gigabytes of data and dual layer that could store 30 gigabytes. The format lasted from 2006 until 2008 when after a decline of sales, Toshiba announced the discontinuation of HD DVD player marketing and manufacturing.

==== M-DISC ====
M-Discs are available as DVD or Blu-ray discs. They are supposed to preserve data up to 1,000 years.Unlike standard recordable DVDs and Blu-rays—which use organic dyes that degrade over time—M-DISC uses a inorganic, rock-like data layer. During the burning process, a high-power laser physically engraves (etches) pits into this durable layer, making the recorded data immune to light exposure, heat, and humidity degradation.

=== Flash memory ===
==== Memory card ====
Memory cards are flash memory storage media used to store digital information in many electronics products. The types of memory cards include: CompactFlash, PCMCIA, secure digital card, multimedia card, memory stick, etc.

==== Memory stick ====
Sony introduced memory stick standard in 1998. Memory stick is an integrated circuit designed to serve as a storage and transfer medium for digital data. It can store data in various form as text, graphics, digital images etc. transfer of data is possible between devices having memory stick slots. Memory sticks are available in various storage sizes ranging from 4 GB to 64 GB. The dimensions of a memory stick are 50 mm long, 21.5 mm wide and 2.8 mm thick (in case of pro format). The transfer speed of memory stick is 160 Mbit/s.

==== USB drives ====
A USB flash drive, also variously known as a, thumb drive, pen drive, jump drive, disk key, disk on key, flash-drive, memory stick or USB memory, is a data storage device that includes flash memory with an integrated USB interface.

==== Solid-state drive ====
Portable solid-state drive (SSD) is a common solid-state storage device that uses semiconductor cells on integrated circuit assemblies for mass storage. Compared to hard disk drives and similar electromechanical disk storage that use moving physical parts to spin a platter or disc, SSDs are typically more compact, quieter, more resistant to physical shock, and have higher input/output rates, lower latency and less power consumption.

== See also ==
- Disk enclosure
- Solid-state drive

== Bibliography ==
- Blanchette, Jean-François (20 April 2011). "A material history of bits". Journal of the Association for Information Science and Technology. 62 (6): 1042–1057. doi:10.1002/asi.21542.
