= 4CH =

4CH may refer to:

- 4chan, an imageboard website
- ABC Western Queensland, a radio station
- Four Corner Hustlers, a street gang
- 4Ch, a partition ID assigned to ETH Zurich, see Partition type
- 4Ch, a function in DOS API primary software interrupt vector
- 4Ch, an operation code in SCSI standalone enclosure services
