= Removable media =

Exchangeable computer storage medium

In computing, a removable media is a data storage media that is designed to be readily inserted and removed from a system. Most early removable media, such as floppy disks and optical discs, require a dedicated read/write device (i.e. a drive) to be installed in the computer, while others, such as USB flash drives, are plug-and-play with all the hardware required to read them built into the device, so only need a driver software to be installed in order to communicate with the device. Some removable media readers/drives are integrated into the computer case, while others are standalone devices that need to be additionally installed or connected.

Examples of removable media that require a dedicated reader drive include:

- Optical discs, e.g. Blu-rays (both standard and UHD versions), DVDs, CDs
- Flash memory-based memory cards, e.g. CompactFlash, Secure Digital, Memory Stick
- Magnetic storage media
  - Floppy and Zip disks (now considered obsolete)
  - Disk packs (now considered obsolete)
  - Magnetic tapes
- Paper data storage, e.g. punched cards, punched tapes (now considered obsolete)

Examples of removable media that are standalone plug-and-play devices that carry their own reader hardwares include:

- USB flash drives
- Portable storage devices
  - Dedicated external solid-state drives (SSD)
  - Enclosured mass storage drives, i.e. modified hard disk drives (HDD)/internal SSDs
- Peripheral devices that have integrated data storage capability
  - Digital cameras
  - Mobile devices such as smartphones, tablets and handheld game consoles
  - Portable media players
- Other external or dockable peripherals that have expandable removable media capabilities, usually via a USB port or memory card reader
  - USB hubs
  - Wired or wireless printers
  - Network routers, access points and switches

Using removable media can pose some computer security risks, including viruses, data theft and the introduction of malware.

== History ==
The earliest form of removable media, punched cards and tapes, predates the electronic computer by centuries, with the Jacquard loom of 1801 using interlinked cards to control the machine. This followed a loom made by Basile Bouchon in 1725 that used paper tape for its instructions. Punched tape was later used in Colossus, the first electronic computer.

Magnetic tape was developed in the early 20th century in Germany, based on magnetic wire recording invented by Valdemar Poulsen in 1898. In 1951, the UNIVAC I was released, using magnetic tape to store data. 8-inch floppy disks were commercially introduced in 1971 by IBM, with them being compacted to 5 1/4-inch by Shugart Associates in 1976. At the same time Compact Cassettes started being used to store data, being popular in the late 1970s and 1980s for holding data for personal computers. In 1982, the 3 1/2-inch floppy disk became commonplace, with its introduction for the Apple Macintosh and Amiga.

The CD-ROM was introduced in 1985, providing much higher capacity than a floppy disk, however could not be written to. This was resolved in 1990 with the introduction of the CD-R. The CD-RW, introduced in 1997 allowed the CD to be written to multiple times, rather than just once, as with the CD-R. DVD versions of these formats introduced in the late 1990s provided further increases in capacity. Additional capacity improvements were achieved with Blu-ray in 2006.

The turn of the millennium saw the widespread introduction of solid-state removable media, with the SD card being introduced in 1999, followed by the USB flash drive in 2000. The capacity of these removable flash drives improved over time, with 2013 seeing Kingston unveiling a 1 terabyte USB flash drive.

== Floppy disk storage ==
Storage is intended to be used to access data that is access less often. Memory on the other hand is used to access data that is used on a more frequent basis. One of the problems with the earliest computers was how to store data. In the 1950s the International Business Machines (IBM) was trying to solve this problem.

The first floppy disk was developed under the supervision of Alan Shugart in the late 1960s. The floppy disk was not introduced to the public until the 1970s by IBM. But, like any man-made product the floppy disk came with its pros and cons, such as it being cheap and portable while also having severely limited data storage.

== Risks ==
The use of removable media creates a risk of data loss in the event that the media is lost or stolen. This can lead to the compromise of large amounts of sensitive data, which can result in significant damage to the reputation of a business, as well as possible financial penalties. This risk can be minimised by company policies that reduce the use of removable media when transporting and storing data, and by encrypting the contents of removable media. Prior to the disposal or reuse of removable media, appropriate steps should be taken to ensure that all data previously stored on the device is not accessible. Additionally, any device holding sensitive data should be kept secure when not in use.

Removable media can also be used as a vector for malware. Attackers generally use social engineering to get someone to put a media device into a computer, for example by leaving an infected drive in a busy location, from which someone may pick up the device and put it into their computer to find its contents, such an attack is known as baiting. Once the device has been plugged in it can be used to infect an entire network. One example of malware that propagates through removable media such as USB flash drives is Stuxnet, which caused significant damage to Iran's nuclear program. The risk from an attack like this can be reduced by automatically scanning media for malware and prohibiting users from attempting to access the contents of removable media of unknown origin.

== See also ==
- Disk enclosure
- Secure Digital card (SD card)
