= LPX =

LPX can mean:

- Landing Platform eXperimental, a classification of warship characterized by the South Korean LPX Dokdo
- Liepāja International Airport
- LPX (form factor), motherboard standard
- Lean Packet Exchange protocol, an Ethernet protocol used to communicate with the variant Network Direct Attached Storage (NDAS) of NetDisk.
- LPX, a musician solo project by Lizzy Plapinger
