= Storage device =

Storage device may refer to:

- Box, or any of a variety of containers or receptacles...
- Data storage device, a device for recording information, which could range from handwriting to video or acoustic recording, or to electromagnetic energy modulating magnetic tape and optical discs
- Object storage device, computer storage device
- Portable storage device, small hard drive or pen drive
- Cloud storage service such as Google Drive, Dropbox and many more
