= NDAS =

NDAS can refer to:

- Network Direct Attached Storage, a computer network disk access protocol
- National Democratic Action Society, a political party in Bahrain
