= SAF-TE =

Computer storage enclosure industry standard

In computer storage, SAF-TE (abbreviated from SCSI Accessed Fault-Tolerant Enclosure) is an industry standard to interface an enclosure in-band to a (parallel) SCSI subsystem in order to gain access to information or control for various elements and parameters. These include temperature, fan status, slot status (populated/empty), door status, power supplies, alarms, and indicators (e.g. LEDs, LCDs). Practically, any given SAF-TE device will only support a subset of all possible sensors or controls.

== Scope ==
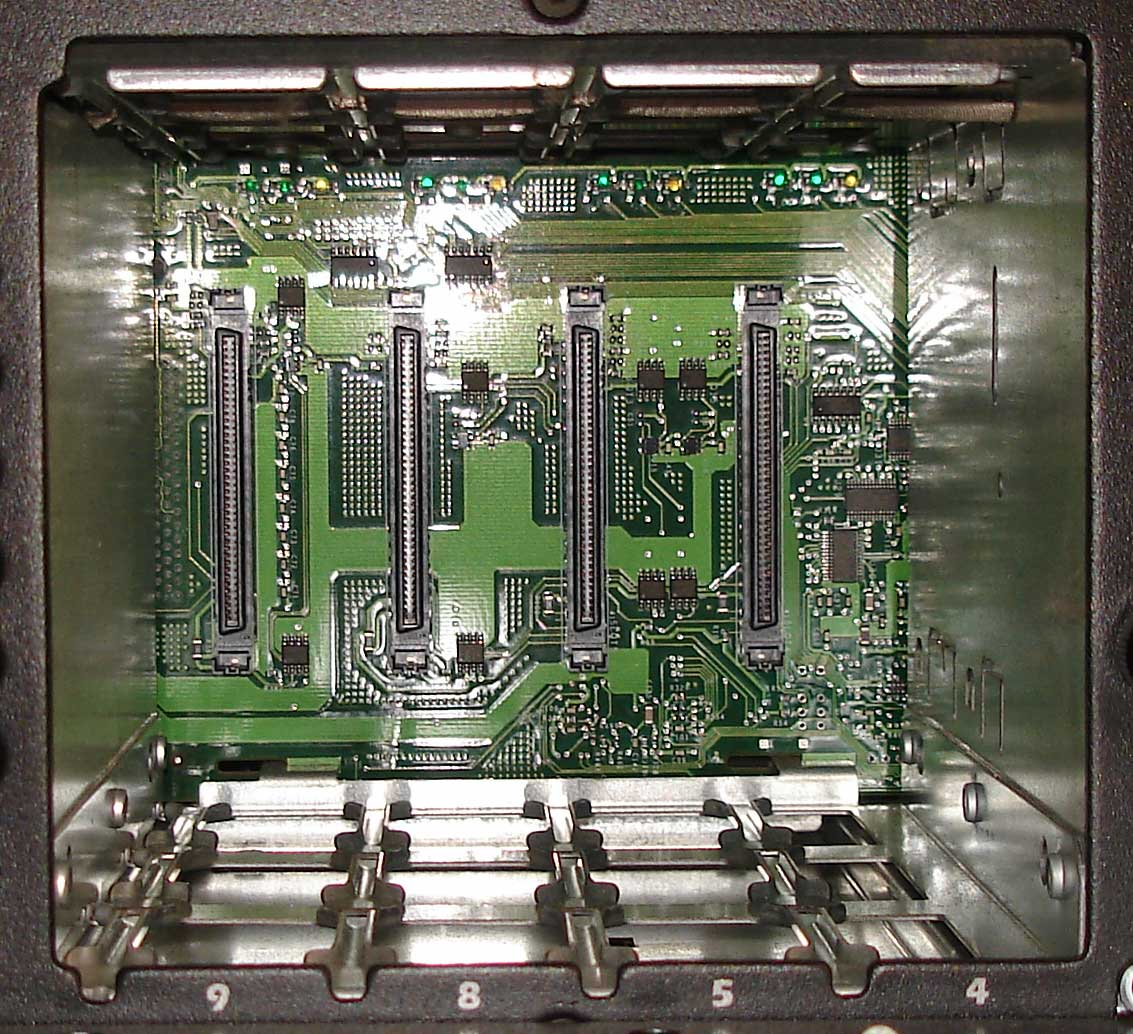
A SCSI backplane with SCA-2 connectors inside an enclosure (SAF-TE device not visible)

Many RAID controllers can utilize a SAF-TE "activated" backplane by detecting a swapped drive (after a defect) and automatically starting a rebuild. A passive subsystem usually requires a manual rescan and rebuild.

A SAF-TE device (SEP) is represented as a SCSI processor device that is polled every few seconds by e.g. the RAID controller software. Due to the low overhead required, impact on bus performance is negligible. For SAS or Fibre Channel systems, SAF-TE is replaced by the more standardized SCSI Enclosure Services (SES).

The most widely used version was defined in the SAF-TE Interface Specification Intermediate Review R041497, released on April 14, 1997 by nStor (now part of Seagate Technology) and Intel.

== Command interface ==
Status requests are performed as READ BUFFER SCSI commands, enclosure action requests as WRITE BUFFER commands.

Command type	Opcode	mandatory / optional	Command	Description
READ BUFFER	00h	m	Read enclosure configuration	inquire about system components in the enclosure
READ BUFFER	01h	m	Read enclosure status	inquire about operational status of enclosure components
READ BUFFER	02h	o	Read usage statistics	fetch information about total usage time and number of power-cycles
READ BUFFER	03h	o	Read device insertions	returns information on how many times a device has been inserted into each enclosure slot
READ BUFFER	04h	m	Read device slot status	returns information on the current state of each slot
READ BUFFER	05h	o	Read global flags	read global flags from processor
WRITE BUFFER	10h	m	Write device slot status	updates state of the slots, essentially drives LEDs, alarms etc.
WRITE BUFFER	11h	o	Set SCSI ID	set the SCSI ID of any device on the channel
WRITE BUFFER	12h	m	Perform slot operation	prepare a slot for insertion or removal (electronically or mechanically)
WRITE BUFFER	13h	o	Set fan speed	set rotational speed for each fan
WRITE BUFFER	14h	o	Activate power supply	turn a power supply on or off
WRITE BUFFER	15h	m	Send global flags	send global flags to processor (audible alarm; indicators for global failure, global warning, enclosure power, fan/cooling failure, power failure, drive failure, drive warning, array failure, array warning; enclosure lock; enclosure identification)

== See also ==
- International Blinking Pattern Interpretation (IBPI)
- Out-of-band signaling
- SGPIO (Serial General Purpose Input/Output)
- SCSI Enclosure Services (SES)
- bioctl § SAF-TE
- hw.sensors
