= Disk enclosure =

Specialized casing

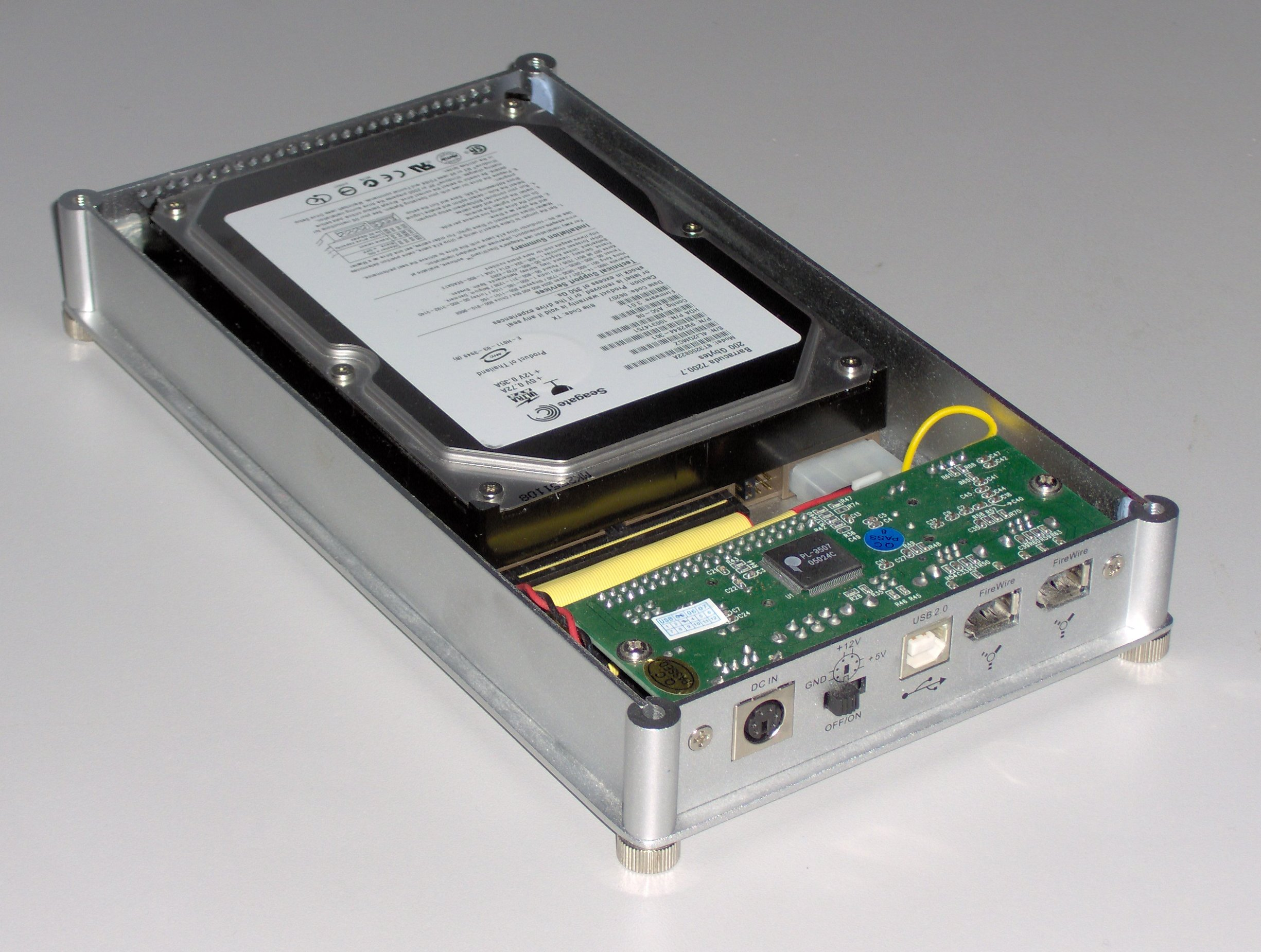
A 3.5-inch USB and FireWire hard disk enclosure with cover removed

A disk enclosure or desktop hard drive is a specialized casing designed to hold and power hard disk drives or solid-state drives while providing a mechanism to allow them to communicate to one or more separate computers.

Drive enclosures provide power to the drives therein and convert the data sent across their native data bus into a format usable by an external connection on the computer to which it is connected. In some cases, the conversion is as trivial as carrying a signal between different connector types. In others, it is complicated enough to require a separate embedded system to retransmit data over connector and signal of a different standard.

Factory-assembled external hard disk drives, external DVD-ROM drives, and others consist of a storage device in a disk enclosure.

== Benefits ==
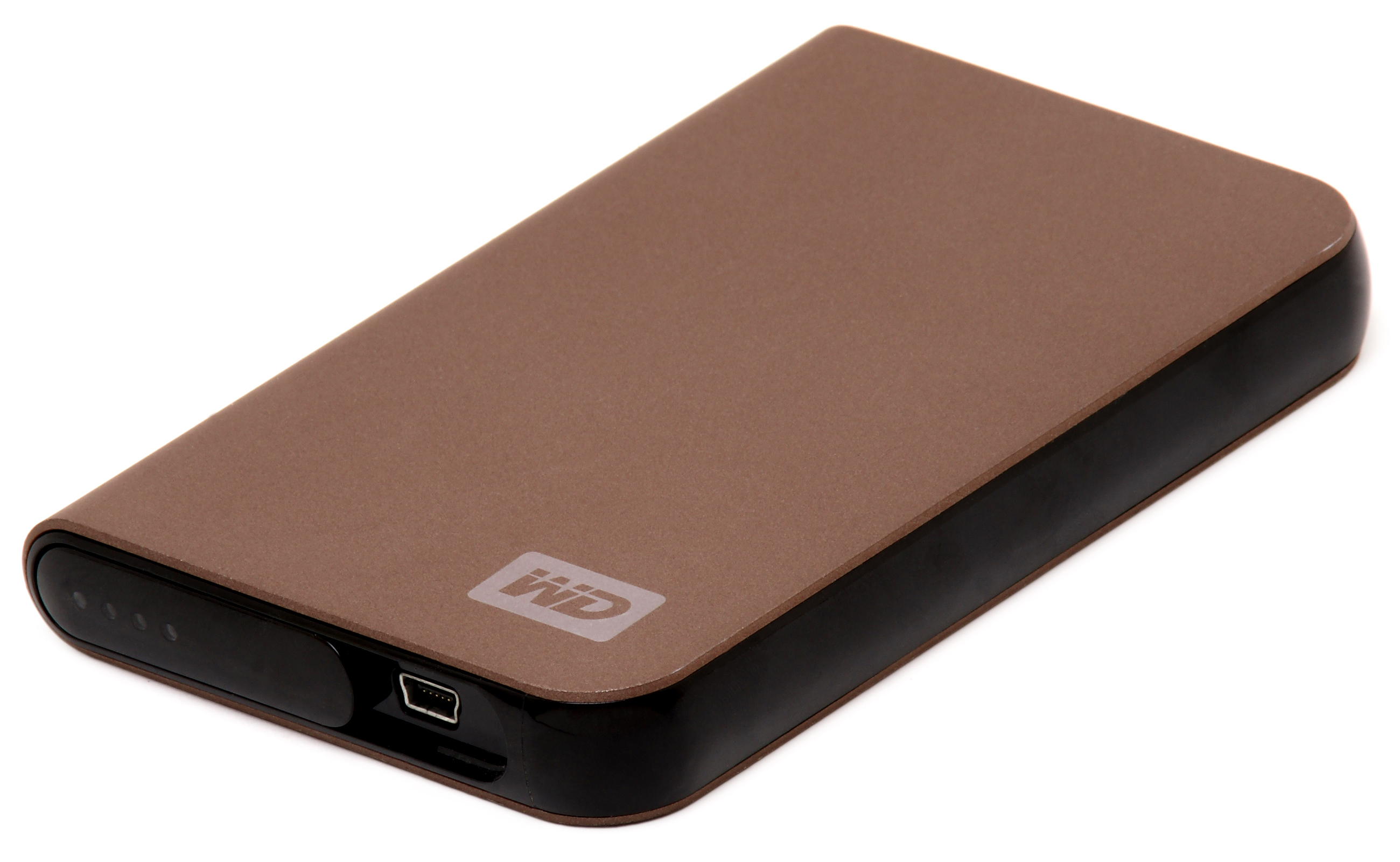
An external hard drive enclosure that uses a 2.5-in drive and a USB connection for power and transfer

Key benefits to using external disk enclosures include:

- Adding additional storage space and media types to small form factor and laptop computers, as well as sealed embedded systems such as digital video recorders and video game consoles.
- Adding RAID capabilities to computers that lack RAID controllers or adequate space for additional drives.
- Adding more drives to any given server or workstation than their chassis can hold.
- Transferring data between non-networked computers, jokingly known as sneakernet.
- Adding an easily removable backup source with a separate power supply from the connected computer.
- Using a network-attached storage-capable enclosure over a network to share data or provide a cheap off-site backup solution.
- Preventing the heat from a disk drive from increasing the heat inside an operating computer case.
- Simple and cheap approach to hot swapping.
- Recovering the data from a damaged computer's hard drive, particularly when it does not share the same interface with the computer used to perform the recovery.
- Lower the cost of removable storage by reusing hardware designed for internal use.
- In some instances, provides a hardened chassis to prevent wear and tear.

== Consumer enclosures ==
In the consumer market, commonly used configurations of drive enclosures utilize magnetic hard drives or optical disc drives inside USB, FireWire, or Serial ATA enclosures. External 3.5-in floppy drives are also fairly common, following a trend to not integrate floppy drives into compact and laptop computers. Pre-built external drives are available through all major manufacturers of hard drives, as well as several third parties.

These may also be referred to as a caddy – a sheath, typically plastic or metallic, within which a hard disk drive can be placed and connected with the same type of adapters as a conventional motherboard and power supply would use. The exterior of the caddy typically has two female sockets, used for data transfer and power.

Simplified circuit diagrams of hard-disk-drive enclosure

Variants of caddy:

- some larger caddies can support several devices at once and can feature either separate outputs to connect each device to a different computer, or a single output to connect both over the same data cable
- some caddies do not require an external power supply, and instead obtain power from the device to which they are connected
- some caddies have integrated fans with which to keep the drives within at a cool temperature
- caddies for all major standards exist, supporting for example ATA, SCSI and SATA drives and USB, SCSI and FireWire outputs

Advantages:

- relatively high transfer speed; typically faster than other common portable media such as CDs, DVDs and USB flash drives, slower than drives connected using solely ATA, SCSI and SATA connectors
- storage; typically larger than CDs, DVDs and USB flash drives
- price-to-storage ratio; typically better than CDs, DVDs and USB flash drives

Disadvantages:

- power; most variants require a supply, unlike CDs, DVDs and USB flash drives...
- size; typically larger than CDs, DVDs and USB flash drives

== Form factors ==
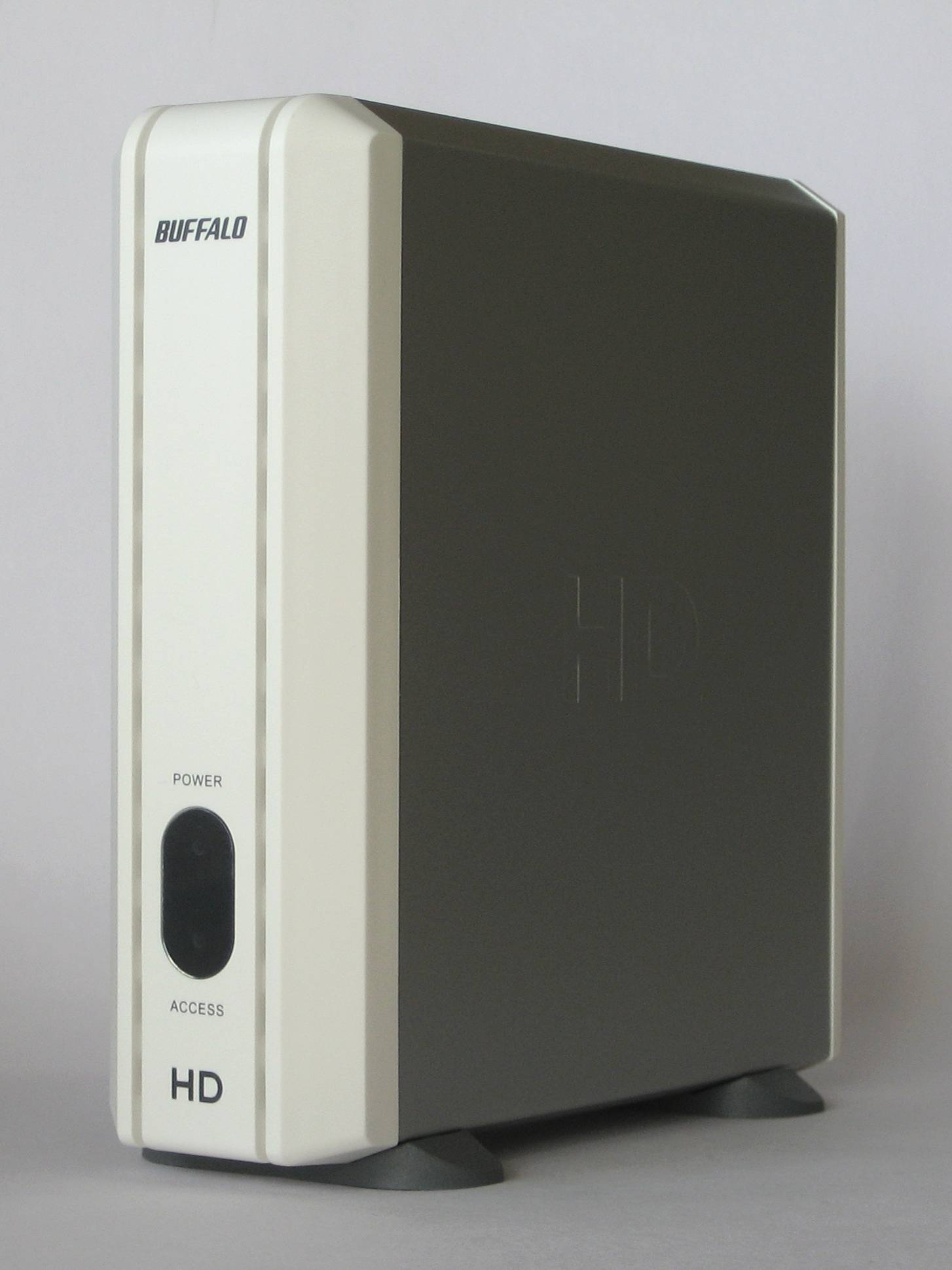
Factory-assembled Buffalo external hard drive in a disk enclosure

- Multiple drives: RAID-enabled enclosures and iSCSI enclosures commonly hold multiple drives. High-end and server-oriented chassis are often built around 3.5-in drives in hot-swappable drive caddies.
- "5.25-inch" drive: (5.75 in × 8 in × 1.63 in = 146.1 mm × 203 mm × 41.4 mm)
  Most desktop models of drives for optical 120-mm discs (DVD-ROM or CD-ROM drives, CD or DVD burners), are designed to be mounted into a so-called "5.25-inch slot", which obtained its nickname because this slot size was initially used by drives for 5.25-inch-diameter (133 mm) floppy disks in the IBM PC AT. (The original "5.25-inch slot" in the IBM PC was with 3.25 in (82.6 mm) twice as high as the one commonly used today; in fact, the PC's drive size was called "5.25-inch full-height", and the size used in the PC AT and commonly used today is "5.25-inch half-height".)
- "3.5-inch" drive: (4 in × 5.75 in × 1 in = 101.6 mm × 146.05 mm × 25.4 mm)
  This smaller, 4-inch-wide (100 mm) disk-drive form factor was introduced with the Apple Macintosh series in 1984, and later adopted throughout the industry beginning widely with the IBM PS/2 series in 1987, which included drives of this size for 90-mm ("3.5-inch") floppy disks. This form factor is today used by most desktop hard drives. They usually have 10 mounting holes with American 6-32 UNC 2B threads: three on each side and four on the bottom.
- "2.5-inch" drive: (2.75 in × 3.945 in × 0.374 in = 69.85 mm × 100.2 mm × 9.5 mm)
  This even smaller, 2.75-inch-wide (70 mm) form factor is widely used today in notebook computers and similar small-footprint devices. One commonplace feature for these drives is radically lower power consumption than is found in larger drives. This enables enclosure vendors to power the devices directly from the host device's USB or other external bus, in most cases.
- "1.8-inch" drive: Found in extremely compact devices, such as certain portable media players and smaller notebooks, these devices are not standardized like their 2.5 inch cousins.

A range of other form factors has emerged for mobile devices. While laptop hard drives are today generally of the 9.5 mm high variant of the "2.5-inch" drive form factor, older laptops and notebooks had hard drives that varied in height, which can make it difficult to find a well-fitting chassis. Laptop optical drives require "slim" 5.25-in enclosures, since they have approximately half the thickness of their desktop counterparts, and most models use a special 50-pin connector that differs from the 40-pin connectors used on desktop ATA drives.

While they are less common now than they once were, it is also possible to purchase a drive chassis and mount that will convert a 3.5-inch hard drive into a removable hard disk that can be plugged into and removed from a mounting bracket permanently installed in a desktop PC case. The mounting bracket carries the data bus and power connections over a proprietary connector, and converts back into the drive's native data bus format and power connections inside the drive's chassis.

== Enterprise enclosures ==
In enterprise storage the term refers to a larger physical chassis. The term can be used both in reference to network-attached storage (NAS) and components of a storage area network (SAN) or be used to describe a chassis directly attached to one or more servers over an external bus (DAS). Like their conventional server brethren, these devices may include a backplane, temperature sensors, cooling systems, enclosure management devices, and redundant power supplies.

== Connections ==
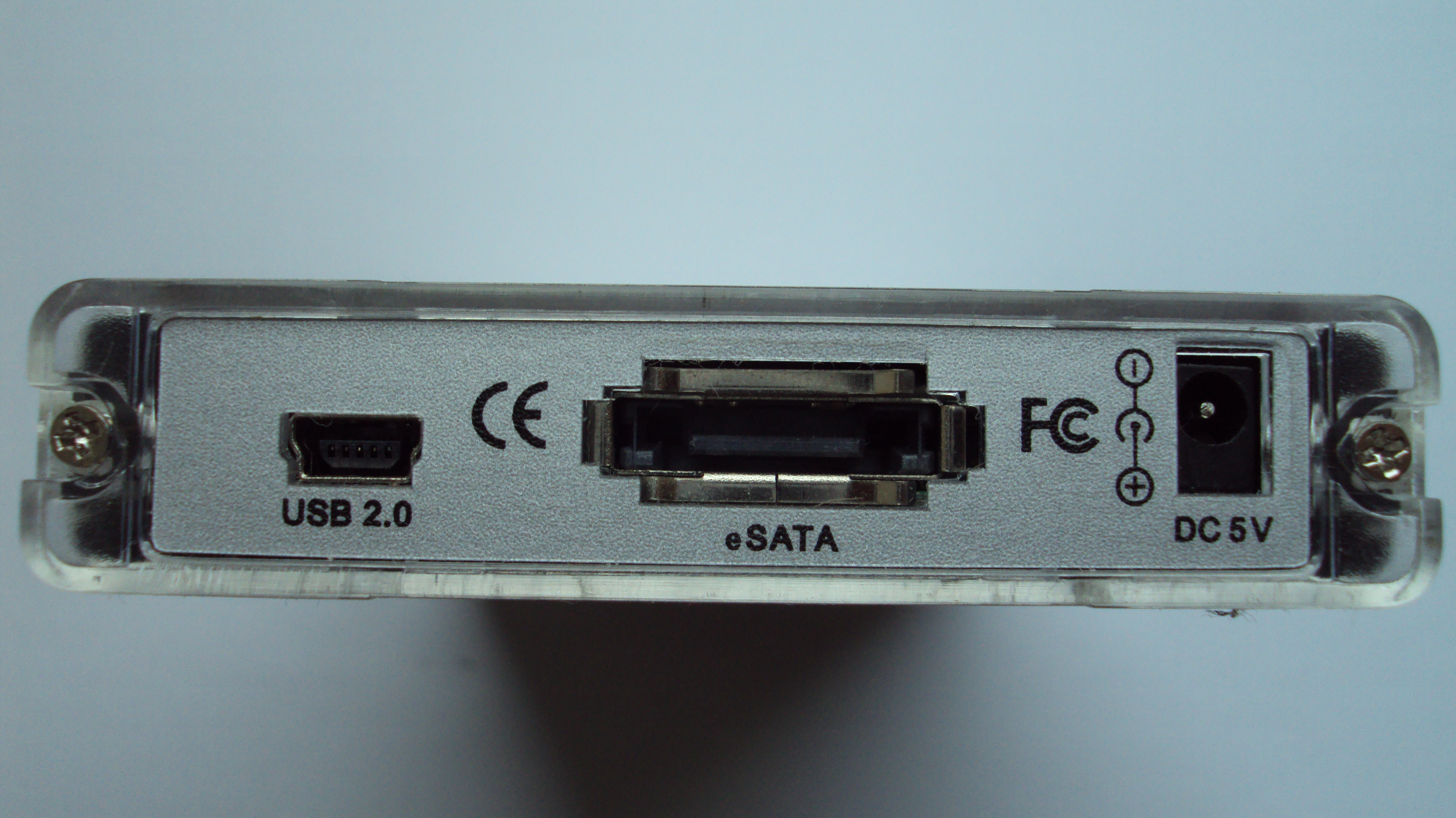
Multiple connectors including external power on a 2.5 inch enclosure

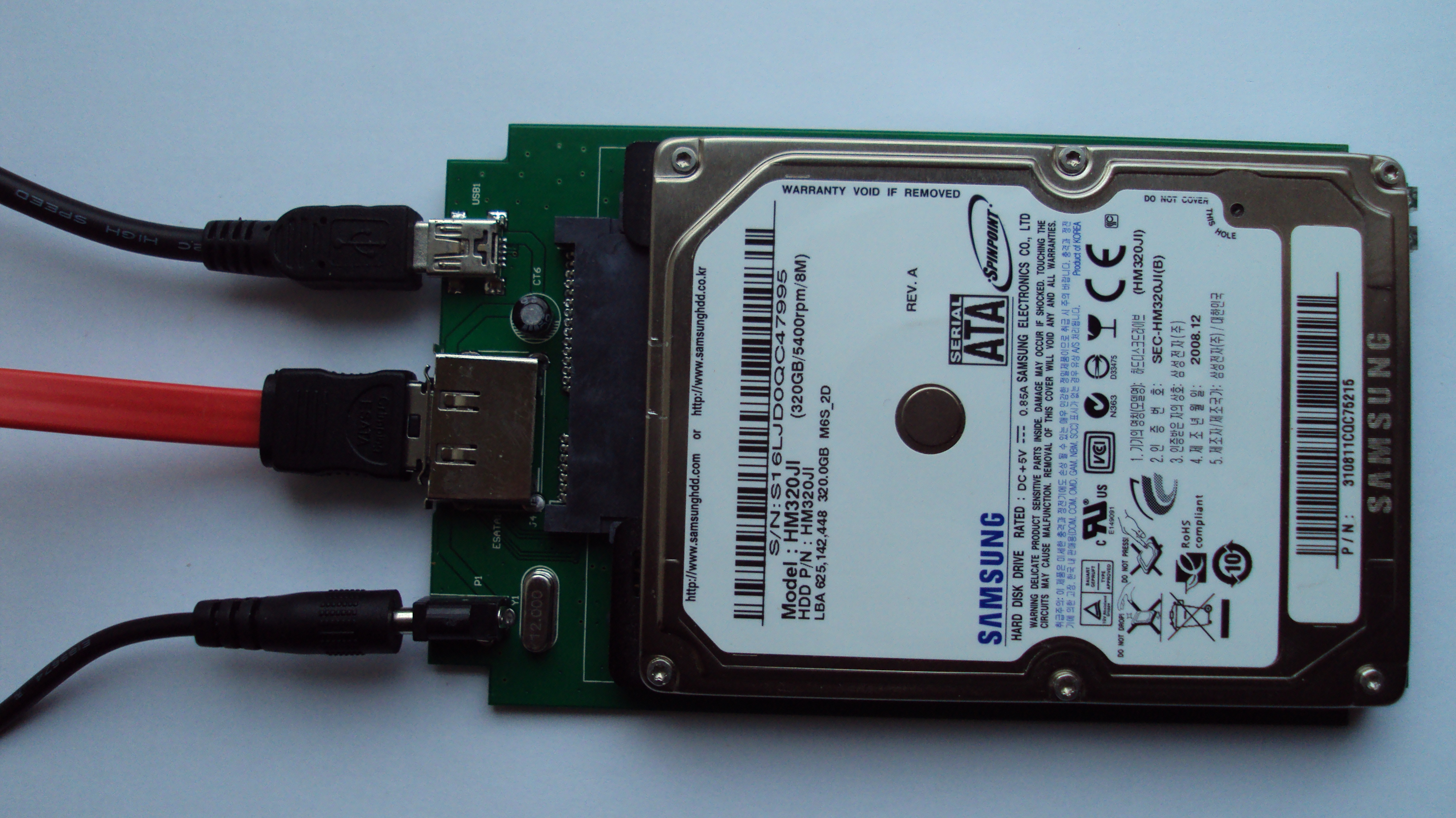
An eSATA and Mini USB hard disk enclosure board

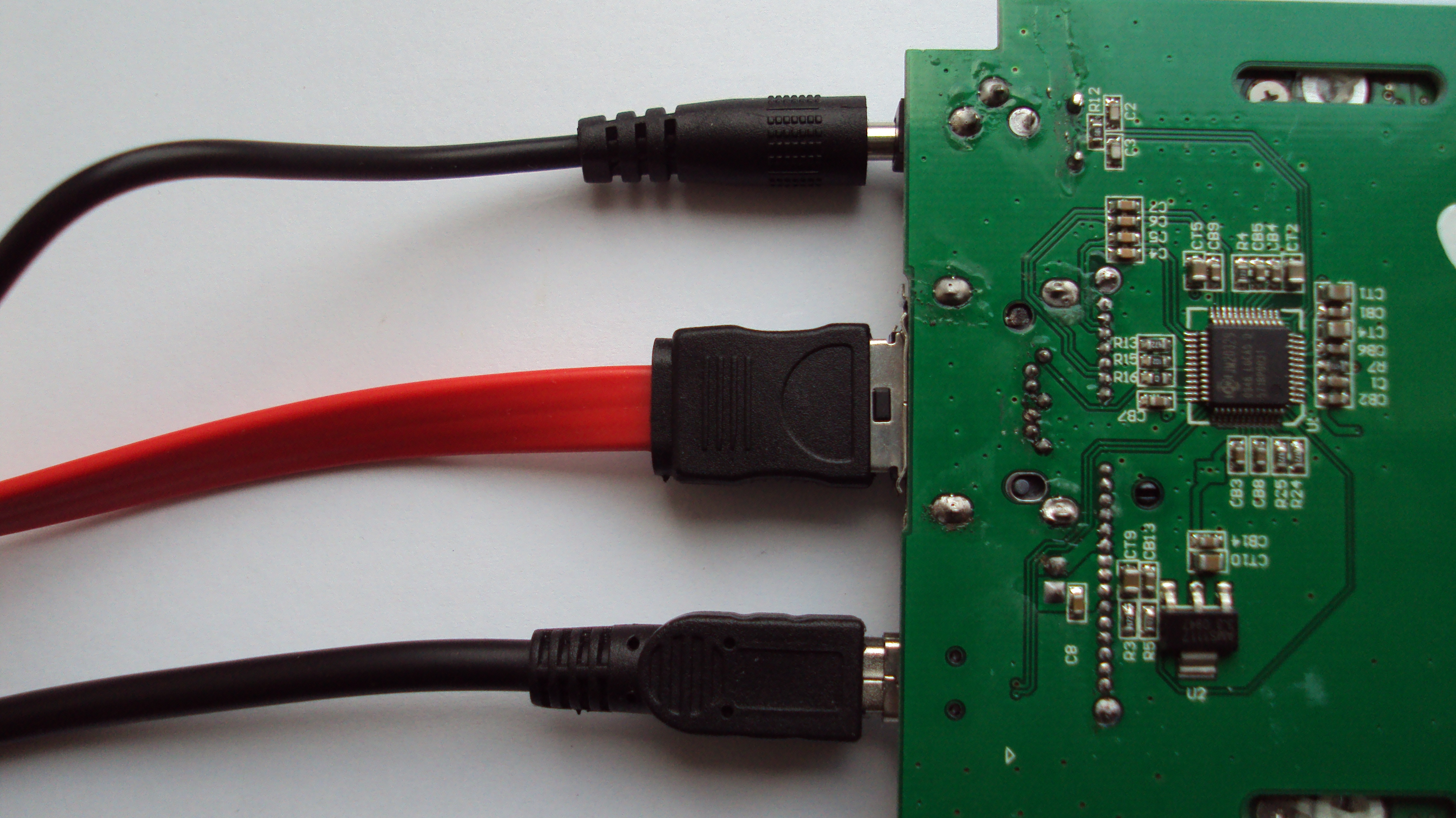
The PCB of an enclosure controls the data transfer, generic mass storage device drivers are readily available on most operating systems

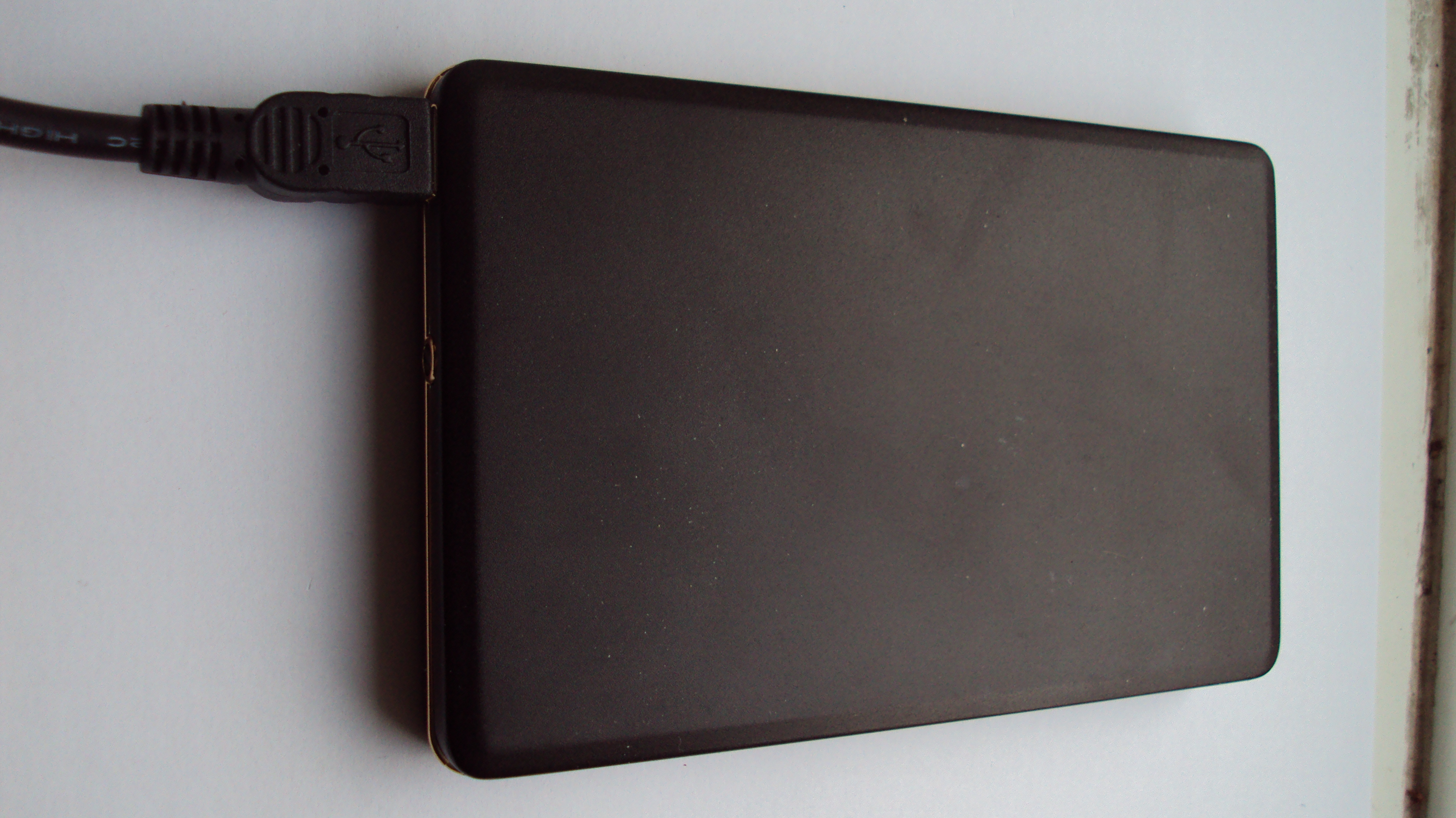
This 2.5 inch caddy uses a single connector mini USB

=== Native drive interfaces ===
SCSI, SAS, Fibre Channel, eSATAp, and eSATA interfaces can be used to directly connect the external hard drive to an internal host adapter, without the need for any intervening controller. External variants of these native drive protocols are extremely similar to the internal protocols, but are often expanded to carry power (such as eSATAp and the SCSI Single Connector Attachment) and to use a more durable physical connector. A host adapter with external port may be necessary to connect a drive, if a computer lacks an available external port.

=== Direct attach serial interfaces ===
USB or FireWire connections are typically used to attach consumer class external hard drives to a computer. Unlike SCSI, eSATA, or SAS these require circuitry to convert the hard disk's native signal to the appropriate protocol. Parallel ATA and internal Serial ATA hard disks are frequently connected to such chassis because nearly all computers on the market today have USB or FireWire ports, and these chassis are inexpensive and easy to find.

=== Network protocols ===
iSCSI, NFS, or CIFS are all commonly used protocols that are used to allow an external hard drive to use a network to send data to a computer system. This type of external hard drive is also known as Network-attached storage or NAS. Often, such drives are embedded computers running operating systems such as Linux or VxWorks that use their NFS daemons and SAMBA to provide a networked file system. A newer technology NAS, has been applied to some disk enclosures, which allows network ability, direct connection (e.g., USB) and even RAID features.

== Hard-drive shucking ==
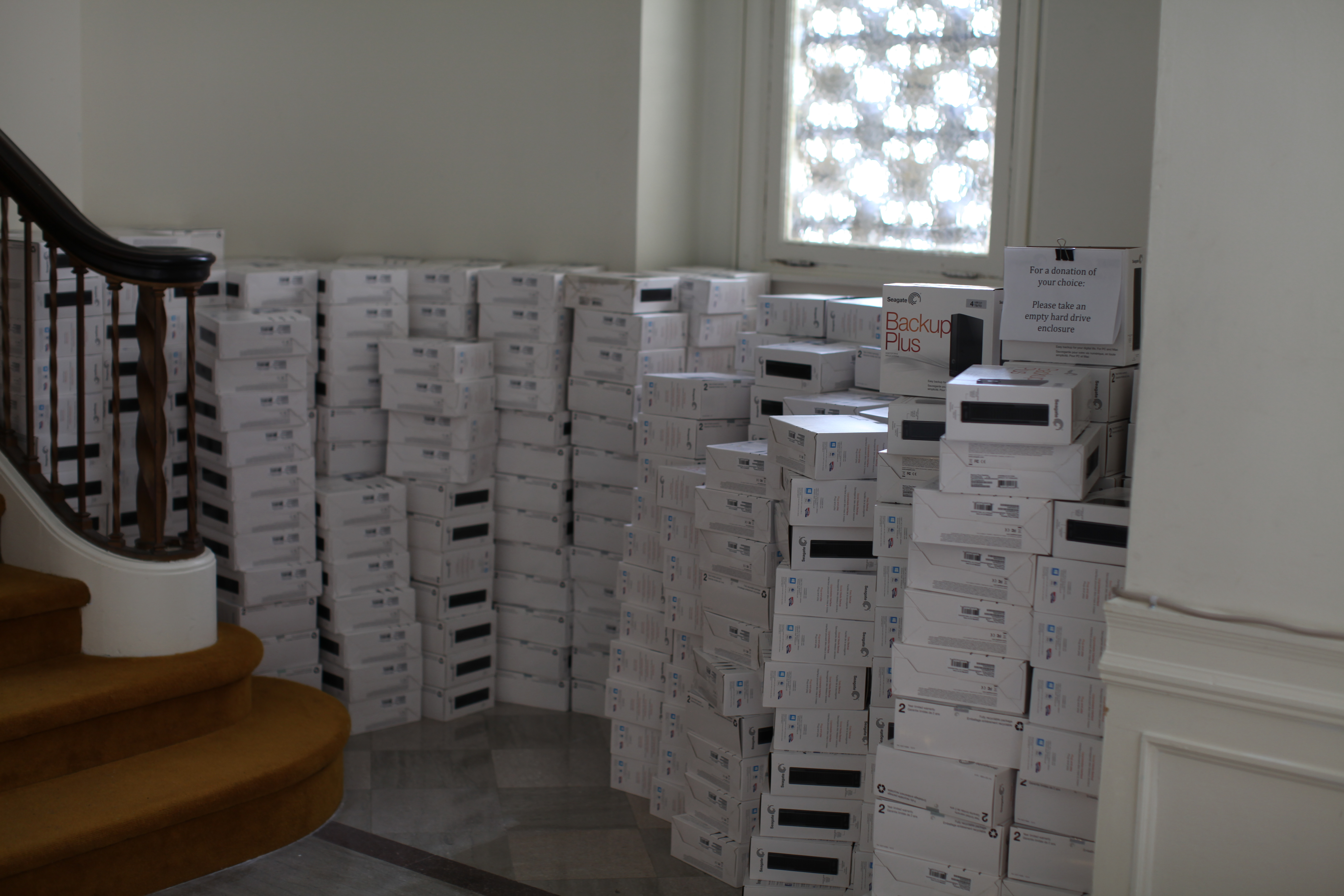
Surplus "shucked" enclosures following a purchase of additional storage at the Internet Archive

"Shucking" refers to the process of purchasing an external hard disk drive and removing the drive from its enclosure, in order for it to be used as an internal disk drive. This is performed because external drives are often cheaper than internal drives of the same capacity and model, and that external drives designed for continuous usage often contain hard drives designed for increased reliability.

Following the hard disk drive shortages caused by the 2011 Thailand floods, data storage company Backblaze reduced its cost of acquiring hard drives by purchasing external hard drives and shucking them. According to Backblaze Chief Executive Gleb Budman, the company purchased 1,838 external drives during this period. Describing the process as "drive farming", the company noted that it was much cheaper for them to purchase 3 TB external drives and removing them from their cases manually, than it is to purchase internal drives.

== See also ==
- Computer case
- External storage
- Network-attached storage
- Network Direct Attached Storage
- SCSI Attached Fault-Tolerant Enclosure
- SCSI Enclosure Services
- SGPIO - Serial General Purpose Input/Output
- USB Mass Storage Device
