= Portable storage device =

Small hard drive or pen drive

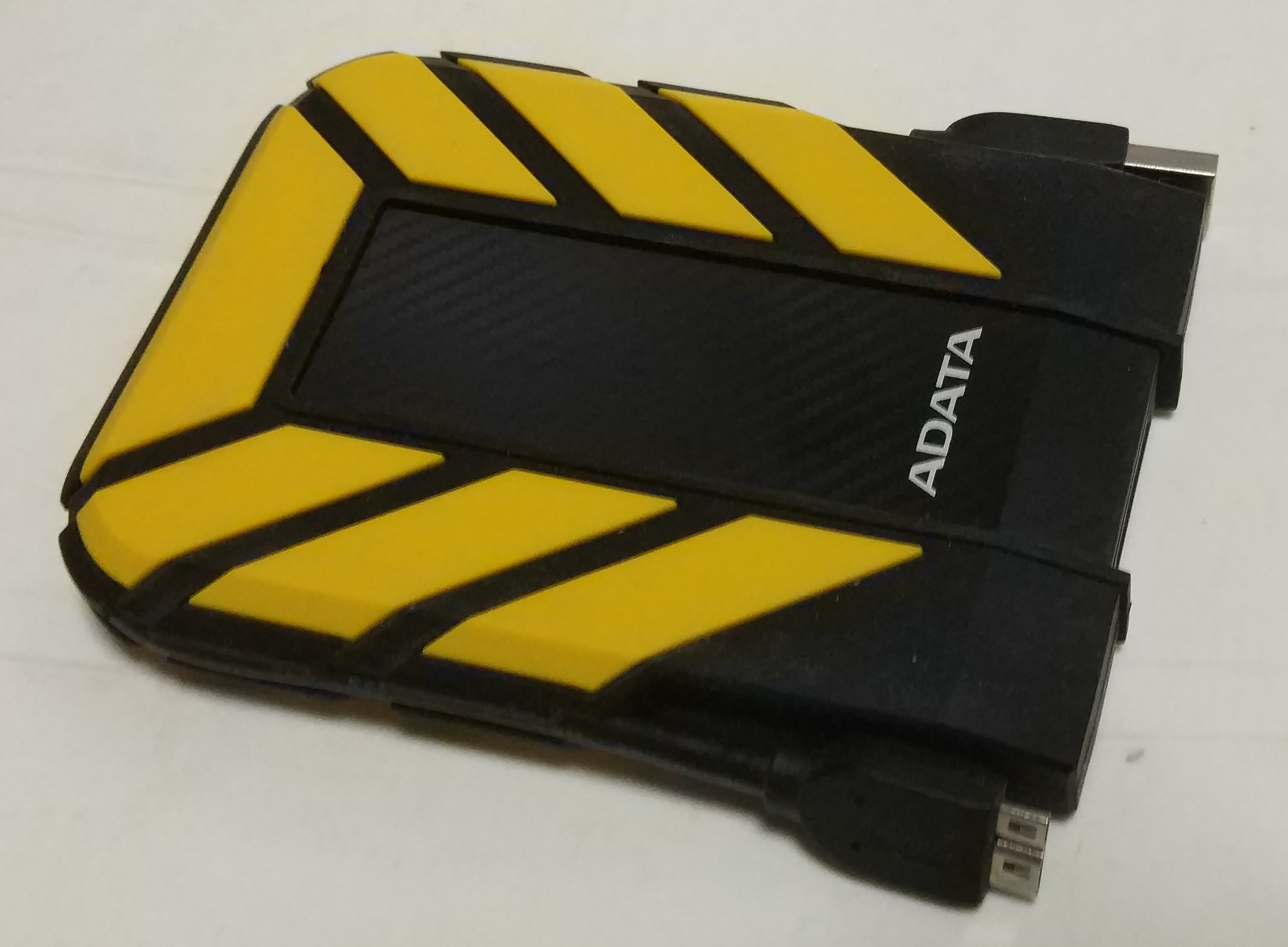
2 TB portable storage device

A portable storage device (PSD) is a compact plug-and-play mass storage device designed to hold a large volume of digital data of any kind. This is slightly different from a portable media player, which is designed to only store music and video files that its internal reader software can play.

Most modern PSDs are dedicated solid-state drives (SSD) that are connected to a computer and powered via USB ports. Some PSDs, usually those from before the wide adoption of SSDs, are modified hard disk drives via the installation of a disk enclosure, and require an additional AC adapter as the power required to operate the drive typically exceeds that can be provided by the USB port. Some smaller portable hard disk drives and portable optical drives do not require an additional AC adapter, but a Y-cable is recommended to provide enough USB current.

PSDs, while much bigger and heavier than ultracompact flash drives such as USB flash drives and memory cards, can offer significantly larger external storage capacities, yet are still convenient enough for carrying around when travelling or as a readily accessible offline backup storage option, especially in situations where online storage alternatives such as network-attached storage and cloud storage are unavailable, unreliable or unsafe.

== Photography ==
One type of data that may be stored is digital photographs (RAW data), transferred from a digital camera.

Many PSDs will connect directly to a camera and copy the images, or they may provide a slot for a memory card to plug in, with or without a card reader device. Some early models allow the user to review the images on a colour screen, but at the top end of the market.

== See also ==
- Computer storage
- Mass Storage Digital Class (MSDC)
