= Talking Electronics =

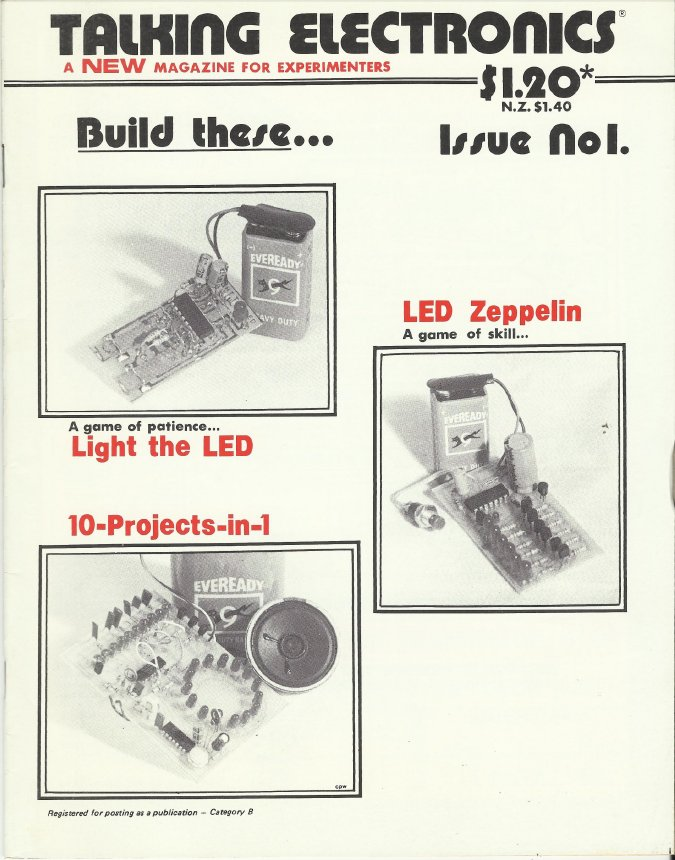
- The first edition of Talking Electronics
- Categories: electronics
- Founder: Colin Mitchell
- Founded: 1980s
- First issue: 1981
- Final issue Number: May 1989; 15
- Country: Australia
- Language: English

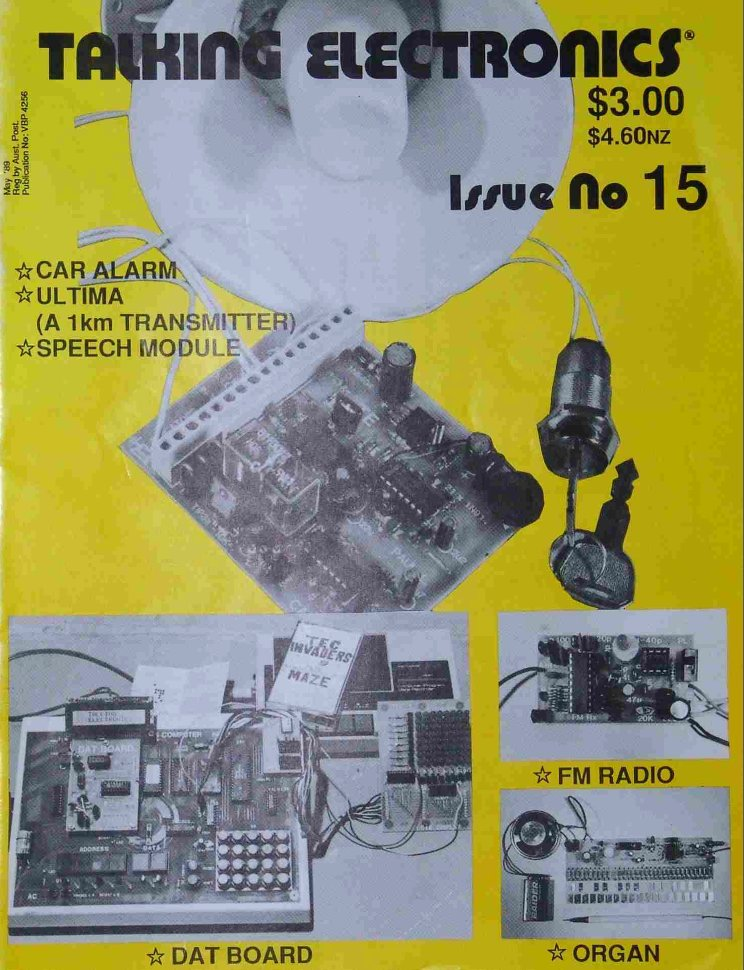
The last edition of Talking Electronics, May 1989

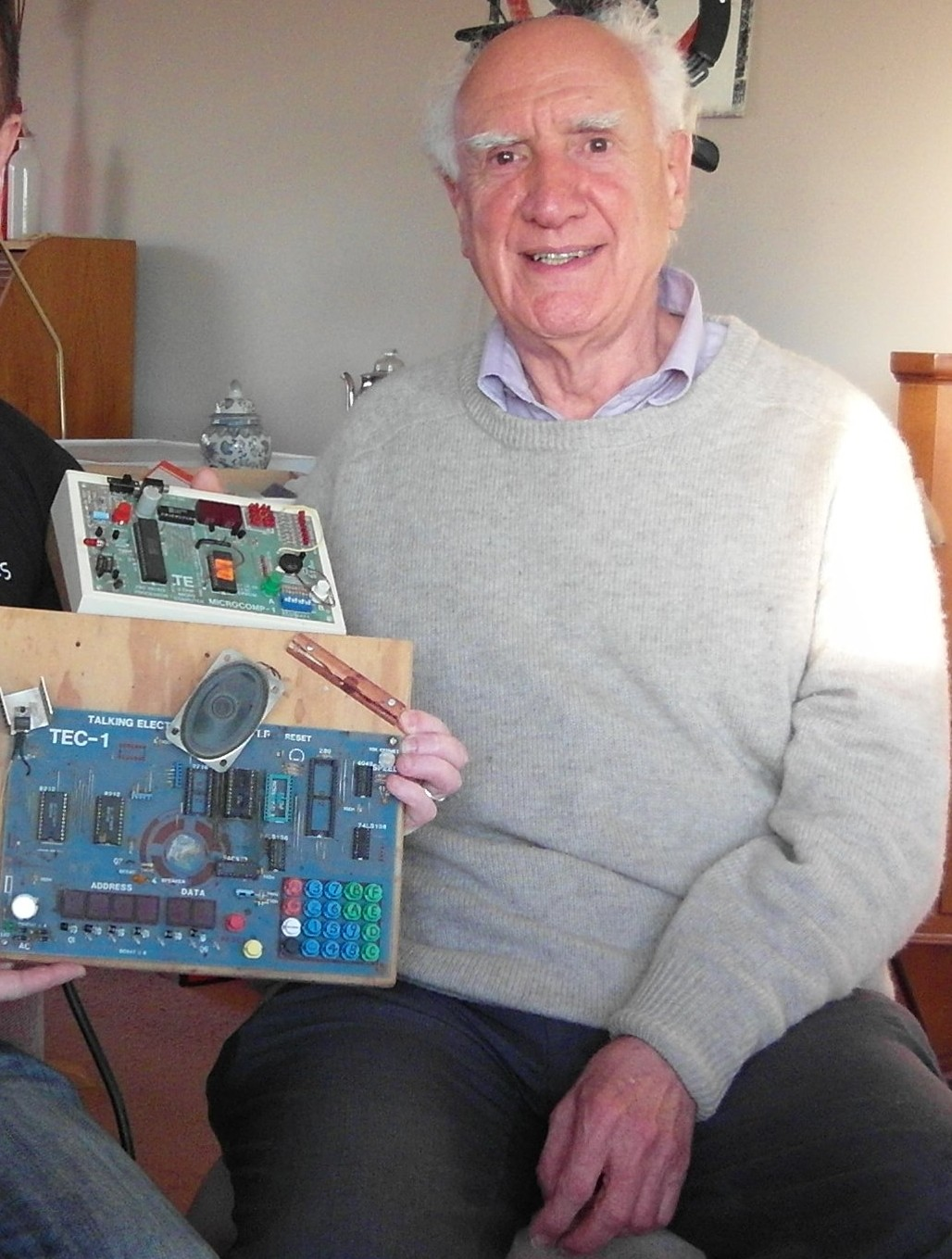
Colin Mitchell in 2011, founder of Talking Electronics Magazine with his original TEC-1 & MicroComp computer.

Talking Electronics or TE was an Australian electronics magazine from the 1980s aimed at beginners and hobbyists, founded and produced by Colin Mitchell in Cheltenham, Australia. The magazine, and its associated mail-order kit business, operated for its entirety out of Mitchell's home. Competing magazines at the time were Electronics Australia, Electronics Today International, and Australian Electronics Monthly.

The general magazine lasted 15 official issues, but there were many one-off publications produced in addition to the issue-based magazine. Some of these included the FM Bugs series of books, The Electronics Notebook series, and model railway projects. The first issue was in 1981, with the last issue being #15 in May 1989.

Mitchell has since released all material, books, and issues of the magazine as public domain on his websites – "Not Copyright 2003 Colin Mitchell - you can copy anything - in fact you should copy all the projects and data sheets."

There was no regular publishing schedule; an issue would come out when it was completed.

It is known as the first electronics magazine in the world to include a printed circuit board on the front cover.

Talking Electronics also sold electronics kits to go along with its published construction projects. This business proved very popular, with hundreds of thousands of kits being sold. Payment for the kits could be made using postage stamps, to make it easier for young hobbyists to afford and pay for the kits.

Talking Electronics produced several bare-bones Z80-based learning computers, including the MicroComp and the TEC-1.

Towards the height of the magazine, Mitchell tried to take Talking Electronics to the United States, but was ultimately unsuccessful at distribution after printing 100,000 copies. These copies were eventually repackaged and sold once he returned to Australia.

== One-off publications ==
- 1984-1994 - Electronics notebook
- 1984 & 1990 - Electronics for Model Railways, Books 1 and 2
- 1985 - Starting in TTL
- 1986 - FM bugs
- 1987 - More FM bugs!
- 1988 - Bugging and its prevention
- 1989 - Talking Electronics presents, security devices
- 1990-1992 - Learning electronics
- 1991 - 14 FM bugs to build
- 1993 - Smart security devices
- 1994 - Talking Electronics presents, Six BD 679 projects
- 1994 - 5 more FM bugs
- 2012 - Testing Electronic Components (ebook)
