= Backplane =

Group of electrical connectors specifically aligned

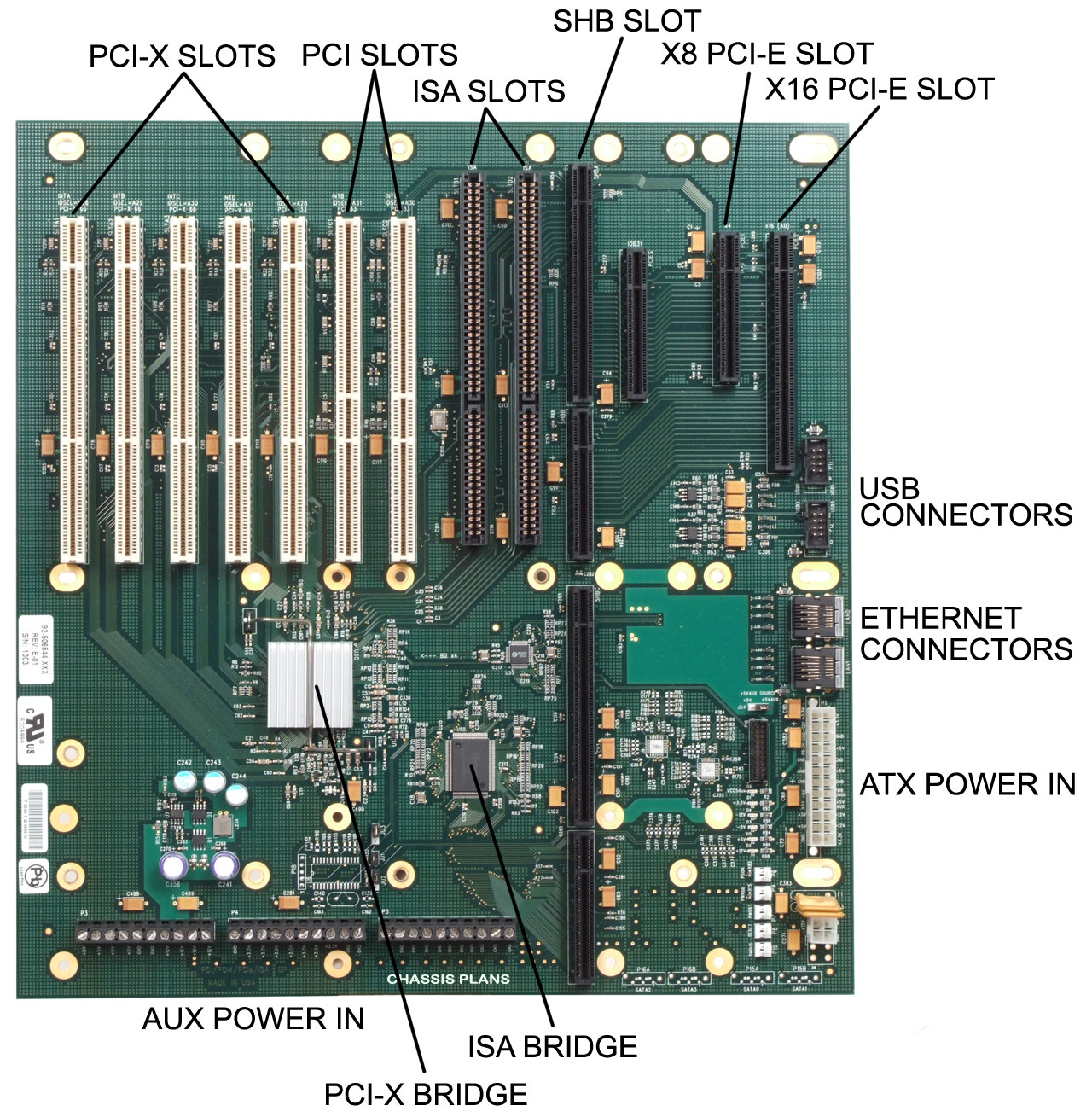
Major components on a PICMG 1.3 active backplane

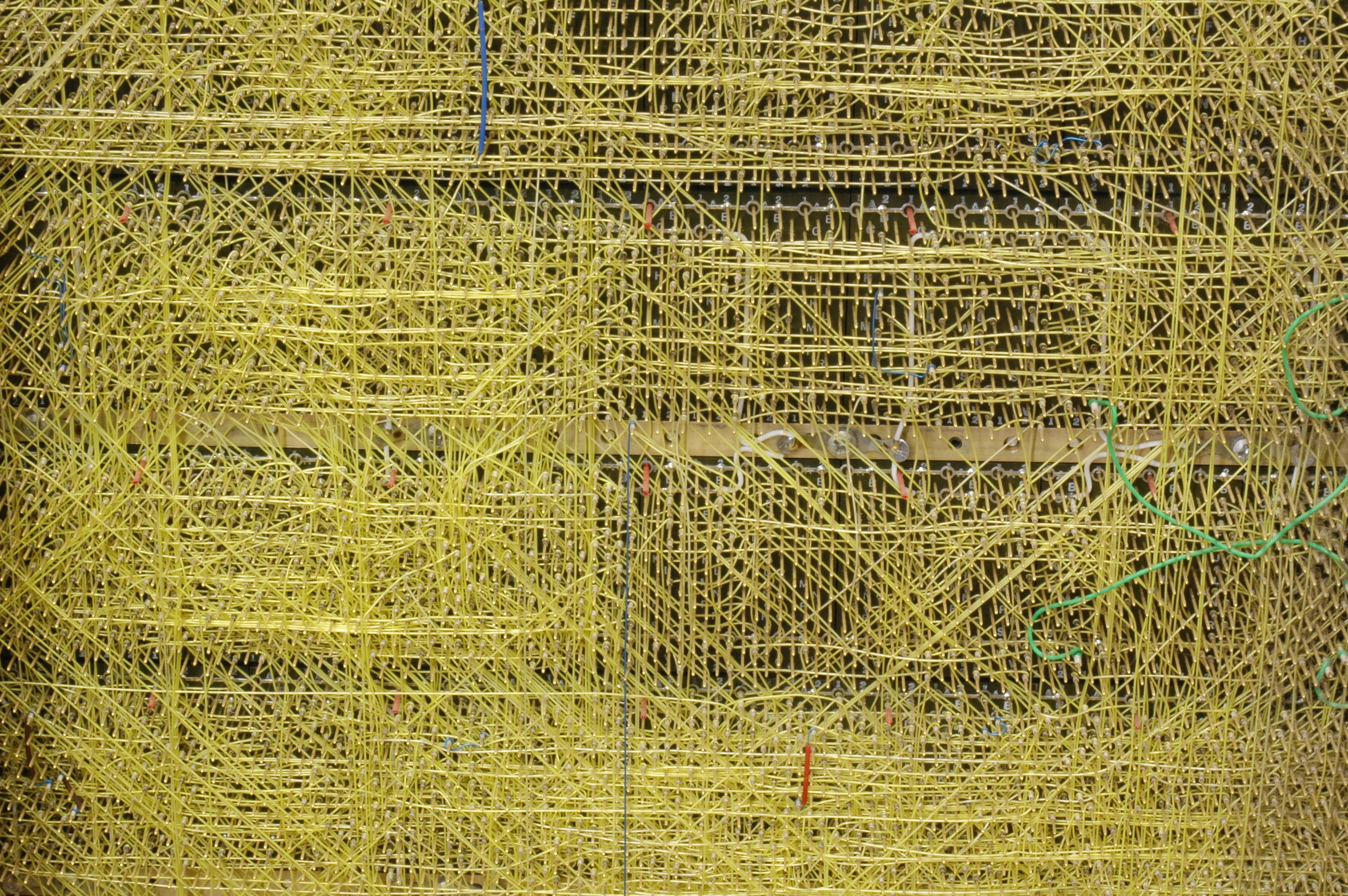
Wire-wrapped backplane from a 1960s PDP-8 minicomputer

A backplane or backplane system is a group of electrical connectors in parallel with each other, so that each pin of each connector is linked to the same relative pin of all the other connectors, forming a computer bus. It is used to connect several printed circuit boards together to make up a complete computer system. Backplanes commonly use a printed circuit board, but wire-wrapped backplanes have also been used in minicomputers and high-reliability applications.

A backplane is generally differentiated from a motherboard by the lack of on-board processing and storage elements. A backplane uses plug-in cards for storage and processing.

== Usage ==
Early microcomputer systems like the Altair 8800 used a backplane for the processor and expansion cards.

Backplanes are normally used in preference to cables because of their greater reliability. In a cabled system, the cables need to be flexed every time that a card is added or removed from the system; this flexing eventually causes mechanical failures. A backplane does not suffer from this problem, so its service life is limited only by the longevity of its connectors. For example, DIN 41612 connectors (used in the VMEbus system) have three durability grades built to withstand (respectively) 50, 400 and 500 insertions and removals, or "mating cycles". To transmit information, Serial Back-Plane technology uses a low-voltage differential signaling transmission method for sending information.

In addition, there are bus expansion cables which will extend a computer bus to an external backplane, usually located in an enclosure, to provide more or different slots than the host computer provides. These cable sets have a transmitter board located in the computer, an expansion board in the remote backplane, and a cable between the two.

== Active versus passive backplanes ==
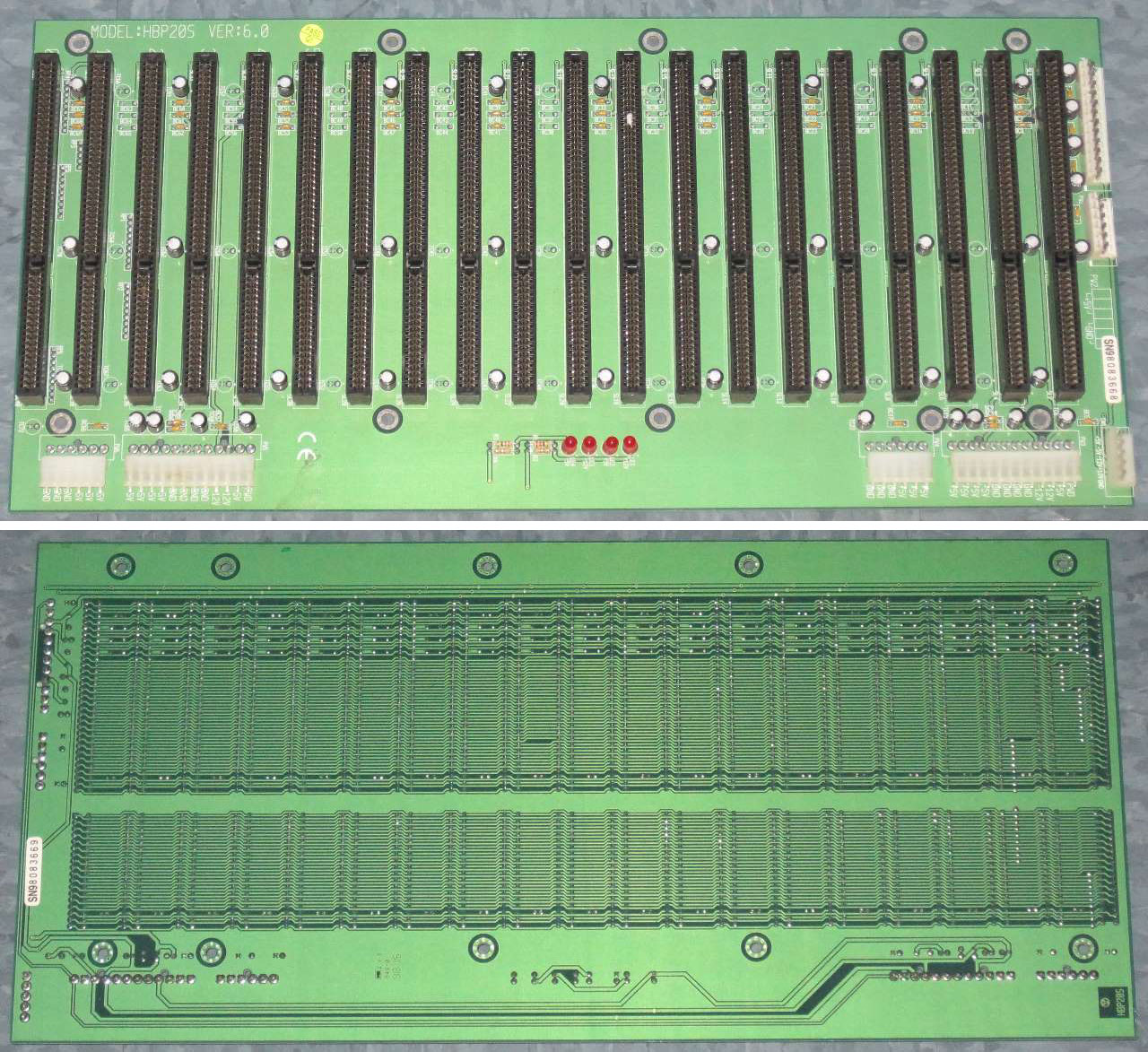
ISA passive backplane showing connectors and parallel signal traces on back side. Only components are connectors, capacitors, resistors and voltage indicator LEDs.

Backplanes have grown in complexity from the simple Industry Standard Architecture (ISA) (used in the original IBM PC) or S-100 style where all the connectors were connected to a common bus. Due to limitations inherent in the Peripheral Component Interconnect (PCI) specification for driving slots, backplanes are now offered as passive and active.

True passive backplanes offer no active bus driving circuitry. Any desired arbitration logic is placed on the daughter cards. Active backplanes include chips which buffer the various signals to the slots.

The distinction between the two isn't always clear, but may become an important issue if a whole system is expected to not have a single point of failure (SPOF) . Common myth around passive backplane, even if it is single, is not usually considered a SPOF. Active back-planes are even more complicated and thus have a non-zero risk of malfunction. However one situation that can cause disruption both in the case of Active and Passive Back-planes is while performing maintenance activities i.e. while swapping boards there is always a possibility of damaging the Pins/Connectors on the Back-plane, this may cause full outage for the system as all boards mounted on the back-plane should be removed in order to fix the system. Therefore, we are seeing newer architectures where systems use high speed redundant connectivity to interconnect system boards point to point with No Single Point of Failure anywhere in the system.

== Backplanes versus motherboards ==
When a backplane is used with a plug-in single-board computer (SBC) or system host board (SHB), the combination provides the same functionality as a motherboard, providing processing power, memory, I/O and slots for plug-in cards. While there are a few motherboards that offer more than eight slots, that is the traditional limit. In addition, as technology progresses, the availability and number of a particular slot type may be limited in terms of what is currently offered by motherboard manufacturers.

However, backplane architecture is somewhat unrelated to the SBC technology plugged into it. There are some limitations to what can be constructed, in that the SBC chip set and processor have to provide the capability of supporting the slot types. In addition, virtually an unlimited number of slots can be provided with 20, including the SBC slot, as a practical though not an absolute limit. Thus, a PICMG backplane can provide any number and any mix of ISA, PCI, PCI-X, and PCI-e slots, limited only by the ability of the SBC to interface to and drive those slots. For example, an SBC with the latest i7 processor could interface with a backplane providing up to 19 ISA slots to drive legacy I/O cards.

== Midplane ==
Some backplanes are constructed with slots for connecting to devices on both sides, and are referred to as midplanes. This ability to plug cards into either side of a midplane is often useful in larger systems made up primarily of modules attached to the midplane.

Midplanes are often used in computers, mostly in blade servers, where server blades reside on one side and the peripheral (power, networking, and other I/O) and service modules reside on the other. Midplanes are also popular in networking and telecommunications equipment where one side of the chassis accepts system processing cards and the other side of the chassis accepts network interface cards.

Orthogonal midplanes connect vertical cards on one side to horizontal boards on the other side. One common orthogonal midplane connects many vertical telephone line cards on one side, each one connected to copper telephone wires, to a horizontal communications card on the other side.

A "virtual midplane" is an imaginary plane between vertical cards on one side that directly connect to horizontal boards on the other side; the card-slot aligners of the card cage and self-aligning connectors on the cards hold the cards in position.

Some people use the term "midplane" to describe a board that sits between and connects a hard drive hot-swap backplane and redundant power supplies.

== Backplanes in storage ==
Servers commonly have a backplane to attach hot swappable hard disk drives and solid state drives; backplane pins pass directly into hard drive sockets without cables. They may have single connector to connect one disk array controller or multiple connectors that can be connected to one or more controllers in arbitrary way. Backplanes are commonly found in disk enclosures, disk arrays, and servers.

Backplanes for SAS and SATA HDDs most commonly use the SGPIO protocol as means of communication between the host adapter and the backplane. Alternatively SCSI Enclosure Services can be used. With Parallel SCSI subsystems, SAF-TE is used.

== Platforms ==
=== PICMG ===
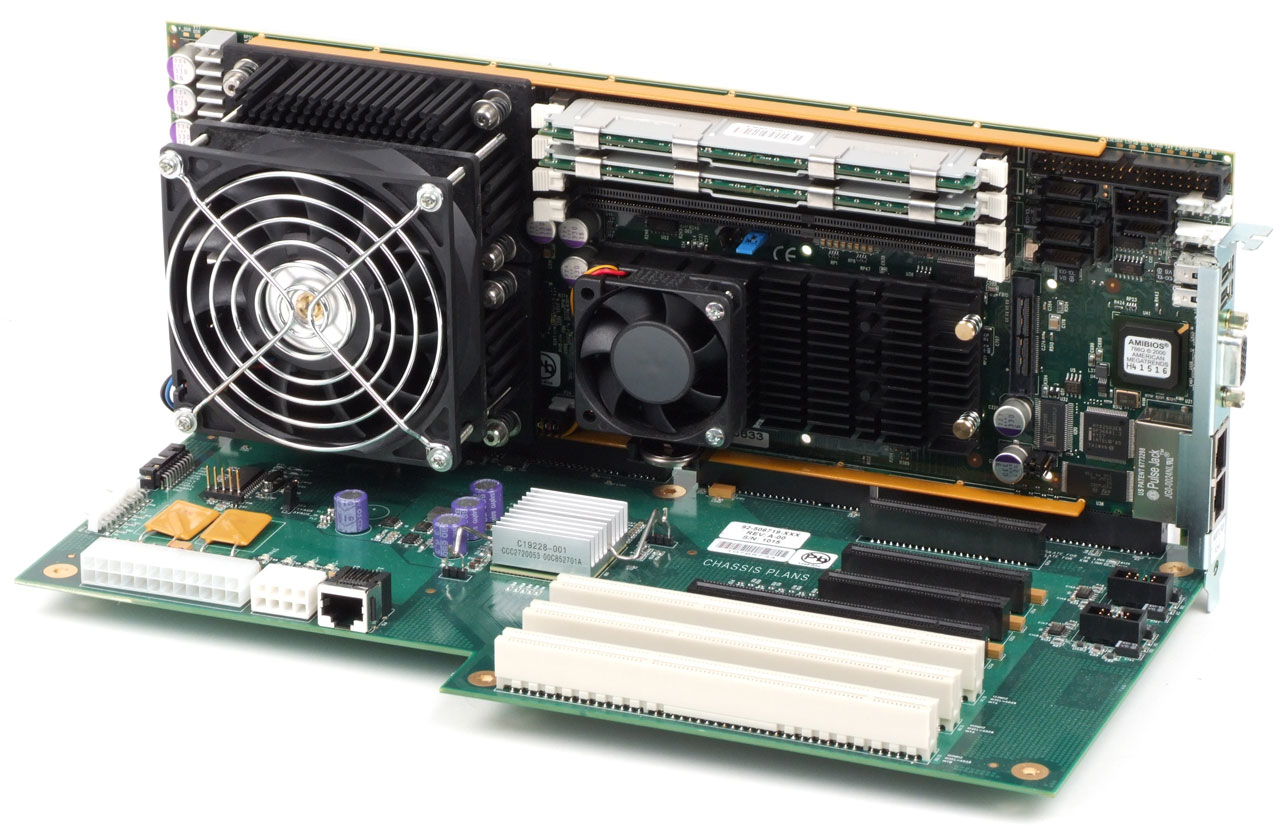
A single-board computer installed into a passive backplane

A single-board computer meeting the PICMG 1.3 specification and compatible with a PICMG 1.3 backplane is referred to as a system host board.

In the Intel single-board computer ecosystem, PICMG provides standards for the backplane interface: PICMG 1.0, 1.1 and 1.2 provide ISA and PCI support, with 1.2 adding PCIX support. PICMG 1.3 provides PCI-Express support.

== See also ==
- Daughterboard – Circuit board for connecting to a computer system to add functionality
- Eurocard – Standard for PCBs which may be interconnected in a rack mounted chassis
- M-Module – Standard for computer daughterboards
- SS-50 Bus – Computer bus for 8-bit systems
- STD Bus – Computer bus
- STEbus – Non-proprietary, processor-independent, computer bus
- Switched fabric – Network topology in which nodes are interconnected by network switches
- VXI – Standards for automated test based upon VMEbus
