= SCSI Enclosure Services =

SCSI Enclosure Services (SES) is a protocol for more modern SCSI enclosure products. An initiator can communicate with the enclosure using a specialized set of SCSI commands to access power, cooling, and other non-data characteristics.

== SES devices ==
There are two major classes of SES devices:

- Attached enclosure services devices allow SES communication through a logical unit within one SCSI disk drive located in the enclosure. The disk-drive then communicates with the enclosure by some other method, the only commonly used one being Enclosure Services Interface (ESI). In fault-tolerant enclosures, more than one disk-drive slot has ESI enabled to allow SES communications to continue even after the failure of any of the disk-drives. The definition of the ESI protocols is owned by an ANSI committee and defined in their specifications ANSI SFF-8067 and SFF-8045.
- Standalone enclosure services enclosures have a separate SES processor which occupies its own address on the SCSI bus. The protocol for this uses direct SCSI commands. An enclosure can be fault-tolerant by containing two SES processors.

== SES commands ==
The SCSI initiator communicates with an SES device using two SCSI commands: Send Diagnostic and Receive Diagnostic Results. Some universal SCSI commands such as Inquiry are also used with standalone enclosure services to perform basic functions such as initial discovery of the devices.

== SES elements ==
The SCSI Send Diagnostic and Receive Diagnostic Results commands can be addressed to a specific SES element in the enclosure. There are many different element codes defined to cover a wide range of devices. The most common SES elements are power supply, cooling fan, temperature sensor, and UPS. The SCSI command protocols assume that there may be more than one of each device type so they must be each given an 8-bit address.

When an SES controller is interrogated for the status of an SES element, the response includes a 4-bit element status code. The most common element status codes are: 1h=OK, 2h=critical, 3h=warning, 5h=not installed.

== SES element thresholds ==
Some SES elements, such as voltage sensors, current sensors, and temperature sensors, have a thresholding function. This allows an enclosure to detect and report unacceptable environmental conditions. The SCSI standard allows for two different threshold levels, noncritical (warning) and critical. Also, each threshold has a minimum and maximum value. So for example the threshold values for the 12 volt power-supply could be set as follows:

- Minimum critical - 10.8 volts
- Minimum noncritical - 11.4 volts
- Maximum noncritical - 12.6 volts
- Maximum critical - 13.2 volts

Threshold values are set by a Send Diagnostic command to the Threshold Out diagnostic page (05h). Threshold values can be interrogated by a Receive Diagnostic Results command to the Threshold In diagnostic page (05h) with the PCV bit set to one.

== Subenclosures ==
A larger SCSI storage enclosure may contain multiple subenclosures. The subenclosure with address 00h is designated the primary subenclosure and can return information about the other subenclosures.

== SCSI attached enclosure services ==
SCSI attached enclosure services is a computer protocol used mainly with disk storage enclosures. It allows a host computer to communicate with the enclosure to access its power, cooling, and other non-data characteristics.

The host computer communicates with the disks in the enclosure via a SCSI interface which may be Parallel SCSI, FC-AL, SAS, or SSA. One of the disk devices located in the enclosure is set up to allow SCSI Enclosure Services (SES) communication through a logical unit. The disk-drive then communicates with the SES processor in the enclosure, usually via Enclosure Services Interface (ESI), or a protocol called DSI for SSA enclosures. The data sent over the ESI or DSI interface is simply the contents of a SCSI command and the response to that command.

=== Implemented commands ===
Only two SCSI commands are implemented by attached enclosure services devices:

SCSI command	Operation code	Comment
RECEIVE DIAGNOSTIC RESULTS	1Ch	Mandatory
SEND DIAGNOSTIC	1Dh	Mandatory

== SCSI standalone enclosure services ==
SCSI standalone enclosure services is a computer protocol used mainly with disk storage enclosures. It allows a host computer to communicate with the enclosure to access its power, cooling, and other non-data characteristics.

The host computer communicates with one or more SCSI Enclosure Services (SES) controllers in the enclosure via a SCSI interface which may be Parallel SCSI, FC-AL, SAS, or SSA. Each SES controller has a SCSI identity (address) and so can accept direct SCSI commands.

=== Implemented commands ===
The following SCSI commands are implemented by standalone enclosure services devices:

SCSI command	Operation code	Comment
ACCESS CONTROL IN	86h	Optional
ACCESS CONTROL OUT	87h	Optional
CHANGE ALIASES	A4h	Optional
INQUIRY	12h	Mandatory
LOG SELECT	4Ch	Optional
LOG SENSE	4Dh	Optional
MAINTENANCE IN	A3h	See note 1
MAINTENANCE OUT	A4h	See note 1
MODE SELECT	15h/55h	Optional
MODE SENSE	1Ah/5Ah	Optional
PERSISTENT RESERVE IN	5Eh	Optional
PERSISTENT RESERVE OUT	5Fh	Optional
READ BUFFER	3Ch	Optional
RECEIVE DIAGNOSTIC RESULTS	1Ch	Mandatory
REDUNDANCY GROUP IN	BAh	See note 1
REDUNDANCY GROUP OUT	BBh	See note 1
REPORT ALIASES	A3h	Optional
REPORT DEVICE IDENTIFIER	A3h	Optional
REPORT LUNS	A0h	Mandatory
REPORT PRIORITY	A3h	Optional
REPORT SUPPORTED OPERATION CODES	A3h	Optional
REPORT SUPPORTED TASK MANAGEMENT FUNCTIONS	A3h	Optional
REPORT TARGET PORT GROUPS	A3h	Optional
REPORT TIMESTAMP	A3h	Optional
REQUEST SENSE	03h	Mandatory
SEND DIAGNOSTIC	1Dh	Mandatory
SET DEVICE IDENTIFIER	A4h	Optional
SET PRIORITY	A4h	Optional
SET TARGET PORT GROUPS	A4h	Optional
SET TIMESTAMP	A4h	Optional
SPARE IN	BCh	See note 1
SPARE OUT	BDh	See note 1
TEST UNIT READY	00h	Mandatory
VOLUME SET IN	BEh	See note 1
VOLUME SET OUT	BFh	See note 1
WRITE BUFFER	3Bh	Optional

Note 1: The initiator needs to send a SCSI inquiry to interrogate the SCCS bit which says whether the SES controller has this command.

== See also ==
- SES-2 Enclosure Management
- SAF-TE — SCSI Attached Fault-Tolerant Enclosure
- SGPIO - Serial General Purpose Input/Output
- bioctl § SES
- hw.sensors
