= Mass storage =

High capacity computer storage devices

In computing, mass storage refers to the storage of large amounts of data in a persisting and machine-readable fashion. In general, the term mass in mass storage is used to mean large in relation to contemporaneous hard disk drives, but it has also been used to mean large relative to the size of primary memory as for example with floppy disks on personal computers.

Devices and/or systems that have been described as mass storage include tape libraries, RAID systems, and a variety of computer drives such as hard disk drives (HDDs), magnetic tape drives, magneto-optical disc drives, optical disc drives, memory cards, and solid-state drives (SSDs). It also includes experimental forms like holographic memory. Mass storage includes devices with removable and non-removable media. It does not include random access memory (RAM).

There are two broad classes of mass storage: local data in devices such as smartphones or computers, and enterprise servers and data centers for the cloud. For local storage, SSDs are on the way to replacing HDDs. Considering the mobile segment from phones to notebooks, the majority of systems today is based on NAND Flash. As for Enterprise and data centers, storage tiers have established using a mix of SSD and HDD.

== Definition ==
The notion of "large" amounts of data is of course highly dependent on the time frame and the market segment, as storage device capacity has increased by many orders of magnitude since the beginnings of computer technology in the late 1940s and continues to grow; however, in any time frame, common mass storage devices have tended to be much larger and at the same time much slower than common realizations of contemporaneous primary storage technology.

Papers at the 1966 Fall Joint Computer Conference (FJCC) used the term mass storage for devices substantially larger than contemporaneous hard disk drives. Similarly, a 1972 analysis identified mass storage systems from Ampex (Terabit Memory) using video tape, Precision Industries (Unicon 690-212) using lasers and International Video (IVC-1000) using video tape and states "In the literature, the most common definition of mass storage capacity is a trillion bits.". The first IEEE conference on mass storage was held in 1974 and at that time identified mass storage as "capacity on the order of 10^{12} bits" (1 gigabyte). In the mid-1970s IBM used the term to in the name of the IBM 3850 Mass Storage System, which provided virtual disks backed up by Helical scan magnetic tape cartridges, slower than disk drives but with a capacity larger than was affordable with disks. The term mass storage was used in the PC marketplace for devices, such as floppy disk drives, far smaller than devices that were not (Note: E.g., the obsolete 1956 IBM 350 stored 5 million six-bit characters, larger than contemporary 1.44 and 2.88 MB floppies.) considered mass storage in the mainframe marketplace.

Mass storage devices are characterized by:

- Sustainable transfer speed
- Seek time
- Cost
- Capacity

== Storage media ==
Hard disk drives dominate storage media in terms of exabytes shipped and are projected to continue to so for this decade.

Solid-state drives (i.e. Flash storage media) are the predominant storage media in personal computers. Flash memory (in particular, NAND flash) has an established and growing niche in high performance enterprise computing installations. Flash memory has also long been popular as removable storage such as USB sticks, where it de facto makes up the market. Flash dominates in cell phones.

Tape is predominantly used for archival storage

Optical discs are almost exclusively used in the physical distribution of retail software, music and movies because of the cost and manufacturing efficiency of the molding process used to produce DVD and compact discs and the nearly-universal presence of reader drives in personal computers and consumer appliances.

The design of computer architectures and operating systems are often dictated by the mass storage and bus technology of their time.

== Usage ==
Mass storage devices used in desktop and most server computers typically have their data organized in a file system. The choice of file system is often important in maximizing the performance of the device: general purpose file systems (such as NTFS and HFS, for example) tend to do poorly on slow-seeking optical storage such as compact discs.

Some relational databases can also be deployed on mass storage devices without an intermediate file system or storage manager. Oracle and MySQL, for example, can store table data directly on raw block devices.

On removable media, archive formats (such as tar archives on magnetic tape, which pack file data end-to-end) are sometimes used instead of file systems because they are more portable and simpler to stream.

On embedded computers, it is common to memory map the contents of a mass storage device (usually ROM or flash memory) so that its contents can be traversed as in-memory data structures or executed directly by programs.

== See also ==
- Data storage for general overview of storage methods
  - Computer data storage for storage methods specific to computing field
    - Disk storage for both magnetic and optical recording of disks
    - Magnetic tape data storage
    - Computer storage density
    - List of device bandwidths
    - Solid-state drive
    - RAM disk
    - RAID
