= Network Direct Attached Storage =

Network Direct Attached Storage (NDAS) is a proprietary storage area network system, originally marketed by the company Ximeta, for connecting external digital storage devices such as hard-disks, flash memory and tape drives via the Ethernet family of computer networks. Unlike other more common forms of networked storage, NDAS does not use TCP/IP to communicate over the network. Instead a Lean Packet Exchange (LPX) protocol is used. NDAS also supports some limited RAID functions such as aggregation and mirroring.

== History ==
In 2001, Han-gyoo Kim of Korea and Zhe Khi Pak of Russia applied for a US patent on a "network-attached disk". By 2002 the first NetDisk (up to 80 GB) was marketed as a low cost alternative to full computer based network storage options. The Ximeta company was founded in 2003. In 2004 Kim applied for a patent to allow multiple clients write access to the shared block storage device. By 2006, sizes up to 500 GB were supported. In 2008 an NDAS device called "ShareDisk Gigabit" created by Co-World Cs in Germany briefly claimed the title of world's fastest network storage device.

In 2011 IOCELL Networks announced ownership of the NDAS system and NetDisk patents. The following year, IOCELL revived Linux client support for NDAS—which Ximeta had "temporarily suspended" in September 2009—by releasing the drivers under the terms of the GNU General Public License (GPL) as the open-source "ndas4linux" project.

== Benefits ==
- Hardware is typically easy to set up and use, particularly when a unit is purchased with a disk installed.
- The disk drive can be used via multiple interfaces (typically eSATA, USB or Ethernet) though not concurrently: USB and eSATA allow access by only one host.
- The disks do not require special formatting so they can be treated as external disks on a wide variety of computers.
- Performance (speed vs. cost) is claimed to be better than similarly priced storage devices.
- Devices are isolated from external network discovery since the protocol is not visible through a router.

== Drawbacks ==
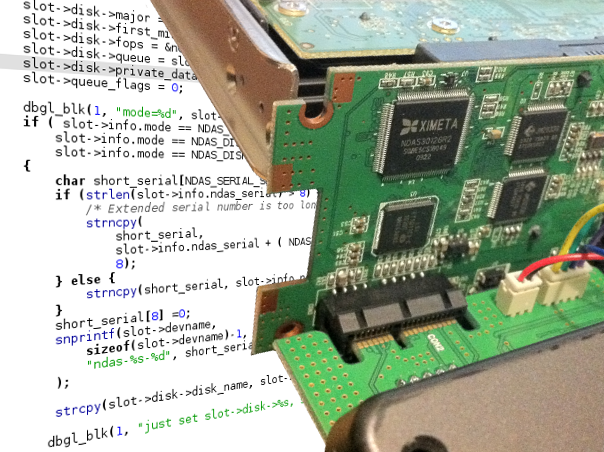
Linux Driver Project Code - chunk of GPL code from the NDAS driver

- The LPX Protocol is not routable, thus limiting access to one local area network.
- Some firewall programs block the LPX protocol by default. It uses EtherType value 0x88AD.
- Drivers required to operate NDAS devices over a network are not shipped with operating systems. The devices are usually accompanied with client driver software for Microsoft Windows operating systems.
- Drivers for Linux-based operating systems (Linux distributions such as Fedora, Ubuntu or Debian) were originally available only from the manufacturer.

== See also ==
A similar protocol is ATA over Ethernet.
