= Communications server =

Communications servers are open, standards-based computing systems that operate as a carrier-grade common platform for a wide range of communications applications and allow equipment providers to add value at many levels of the system architecture.

Based on industry-managed standards such as AdvancedTCA, MicroTCA, Carrier Grade Linux, and Service Availability Forum specifications, communications servers are the foundational platform upon which equipment providers build network infrastructure elements for deployments such as IP Multimedia Subsystem (IMS), IPTV and wireless broadband (e.g. WiMAX).

Support for communications servers as a server category is developing rapidly throughout the communications industry. Standards bodies, industry associations, vendor alliance programs, hardware and software manufacturers, communications server vendors, and users are all part of an increasingly robust communications server ecosystem.

Regardless of their specific, differentiated features, communications servers have the following attributes: open, flexible, carrier-grade, and communications-focused.

== Attributes ==
=== Open ===
- Based on industry-managed open standards
- Broad, multi-vendor ecosystem
- Industry certified interoperability
- Availability of tools that facilitate the development and integration of applications at the standardized interfaces
- Multiple competitive options for standards-based modules

=== Flexible ===
- Designed to easily incorporate application-specific added value at all levels of the solution
- Can be rapidly repurposed as needs change to protect customer investment
- Multi-level, scalable, bladed architecture
- Meets needs of multiple industries beyond telecommunications, such as medical imaging, defense, and aerospace

=== Carrier-grade ===
- Designed for
  - Longevity of supply
  - Extended lifecycle (>10 years) support
  - High availability (>5NINES)
- “Non-disruptively” upgradeable and updatable
- Hard real time capability to ensure quality of service for critical traffic
- Meets network building regulations

== Industry-managed standards ==
Several industry-managed standards are critical to the success of communications servers, including:

=== AdvancedTCA ===
The Advanced Telecommunications Computing Architecture (ATCA) is a series of PCI Industrial Computers Manufacturers Group (PICMG) specifications, targeted to meet the requirements for carrier-grade communications equipment. This series of specifications incorporates the latest trends in high-speed interconnect technologies, next-generation processors, and improved reliability, manageability, and serviceability.

=== AdvancedMC ===
The PICMG Advanced Mezzanine Card specification defines the base-level requirements for a wide range of high-speed mezzanine cards optimized for, but not limited to AdvancedTCA Carriers. AdvancedMC enhances AdvancedTCA's flexibility by extending its high-bandwidth, multi-protocol interface to individual hot-swappable modules.

=== MicroTCA ===
This PICMG specification provides a framework for combining AdvancedMC modules directly, without the need for an AdvancedTCA or custom carrier. MicroTCA is aimed at smaller equipment – such as wireless base stations, Wi-Fi and WiMAX radios, and VoIP access gateways where small physical size low entry cost, and scalability are key requirements.

=== Carrier Grade Linux ===
An enhanced version of Linux for use in a highly available, secure, scalable, and maintainable carrier grade system. The specification is managed by the CGL Working Group of the Open Source Development Labs.

=== HPI and AIS ===
These Service Availability Forum (SA Forum) specifications define standard interfaces for telecom platform management and high-availability software.

The Hardware Platform Interface (HPI) specification defines the interface between high availability middleware and the underlying hardware and operating system.

At a higher layer than HPI, the Application Interface Specification (AIS) defines the application programming interface between the high availability middleware and the application. AIS allows an application to run on multiple computing modules, and applications that support AIS can migrate more easily between computing platforms from different manufacturers that support the standard.

In addition to the standards development organizations mentioned above, four industry associations / vendor alliance programs are playing key roles in the development of the communications server ecosystem.

== Industry associations ==
=== SCOPE Alliance ===
SCOPE Alliance is an industry alliance committed to accelerating the deployment of carrier grade base platforms for service provider applications. Its mission is to help, enable and promote the availability of open carrier grade base platforms based on Commercial-Off-The-Shelf hardware / software and Free Open Source Software building blocks, and to promote interoperability to better serve Service Providers and consumers.

=== Communications Platforms Trade Association ===
The Communications Platforms Trade Association (CP-TA) is an association of communications platforms and building block providers dedicated to accelerating the adoption of SIG-governed, open specification-based communications platforms through interoperability certification. With industry collaboration, the CP-TA plans to drive a mainstream market for open industry standards-based communications platforms by certifying interoperable products.

== Vendor alliance programs ==
=== Intel Communications Alliance ===
The Intel Communications Alliance is a community of communications and embedded developers and solutions providers committed to the development of modular, standards-based solutions on Intel technologies.

=== Motorola Communications Server Alliance ===
The Motorola Communications Server Alliance is an ecosystem of technology, service and solution providers aligned to provide standards-based solution elements validated with Motorola's communications servers. Alliance participants receive access to Motorola embedded communications computing product roadmaps, development systems, and participate in marketing activities with Motorola.

=== Mobicents Open Source Communications Community ===
The Mobicents Open Source Communications Community is an ecosystem of technology, service and solution providers aligned to provide Open Source, Open Standards-based communication software. Community members contribute to the Mobicents product roadmaps, research, development, and marketing activities.

== See also ==
- SAForum
- SCOPE Alliance
- OpenHPI
- OpenSAF
