= Network equipment provider =

Network equipment providers (NEPs) – sometimes called telecommunications equipment manufacturers (TEMs) – sell products and services to communication service providers such as fixed or mobile operators as well as to enterprise customers. NEP technology allows for calls on mobile phones, Internet surfing, joining a conference calls, or watching video on demand through IPTV (internet protocol TV). The history of the NEPs goes back to the mid-19th century when the first telegraph networks were set up. Some of these players still exist today.

== Telecommunications equipment manufacturers ==
The terminology of the traditional telecommunications industry has rapidly evolved during the Information Age. The terms "Network" and "Telecoms" are often used interchangeably. The same is true for "provider" and "manufacturer". Historically, NEPs sell integrated hardware/software systems to carriers such as NTT-DoCoMo, ATT, Sprint, and so on. They purchase hardware from TEMs (telecom equipment manufacturers), such as Vertiv, Kontron, and NEC, to name a few. TEMs are responsible for manufacturing the hardware, devices, and equipment the telecommunications industry requires. The distinction between NEP and TEM is sometimes blurred, because all the following phrases may imply NEP:

- Telecommunications equipment provider
- Telecommunications equipment industry
- Telecommunications equipment company
- Telecommunications equipment manufacturer (TEM)
- Telecommunications equipment technology
- Network equipment provider (NEP)
- Network equipment industry
- Network equipment companies
- Network equipment manufacturer
- Network equipment technology

== Services ==
This is a highly competitive industry that includes telephone, cable, and data services segments. Products and services include:

- Mobile networks like GSM (Global System for Mobile Communication), Enhanced Data Rates for GSM Evolution (EDGE) or GPRS (General Packet Radio Service). Networks of this kind are typically also known as 2G and 2.5G networks. The 3G mobile networks are based on UMTS (Universal Mobile Telecommunication Standard) which allows much higher data rates than 2G or *5G.
- Fixed networks which are typically based on PSTN (Public Switched Telephone Network).
- Enterprise networks, like Unified Communication infrastructure
- Internet infrastructures, like routers and switches

== Companies ==
Some providers in each customer segment are:

Majority of revenues from service providers:

- Alcatel-Lucent
- Ericsson
- Huawei
- Samsung
- TP-Link
- D-Link
- Juniper Networks
- NEC
- Nokia Networks
- Ciena
- ZTE

Majority of revenues from enterprise customers:

- Avaya
- Cisco
- Motorola
- Unify

The NEPs have recently undergone a significant consolidation or M&A activity, for example, the joint venture of Nokia and Siemens (Nokia Siemens Networks), the acquisition of Marconi by Ericsson, the merger between Alcatel and Lucent, and many numerous acquisitions by Cisco.

A look at the financial performance of these players according to the segment they serve creates a diverse picture:

== Power balance in the NEP ecosystem ==
NEPs face high pressure from old & new rivals and a stronger, more consolidated customer base.

Threat of New entrants:

- Growing importance software applications has led to the entry of new players like System integrators and other ISVs. (For some NEPs, SIs are being considered as competitors for selected network services i.e. application, services, and control layers of the network)
- In the area of managed and hosted services, NEPs are likely to face competition from new players like Google due to lower entry barriers

Bargaining Power of Suppliers:

- Increasing standardization and commoditization of network components leads to more competition among component suppliers, thus lowering their bargaining position.
- Overcapacities have led to lower bargaining power of Semiconductor suppliers
- As more standardized networks components are expected to be used for NGNs, a shift in the current supplier structure may balance the bargaining between suppliers and NEPs

Bargaining Power of Buyers:

- Consolidation among communication service providers due to convergence leads to greater dependence on a few large clients, which means higher bargaining strength of customers
- Due to pressures on their profitability, service providers are increasingly looking at lowering their operating costs and capital expenditures (lowering cost per subscriber), and this is putting pressures on NEPs margins.
- Enterprises increasingly demand end-to-end solutions through a single vendor for their Unified Communication needs

Threat of Substitution:

- Switch from PSTN to Next-Generation Network
- Increasing use of standardized network components (COTS) compared to more proprietary equipment
- Software to increasingly replace traditional network components

== Open Source Age ==
The SCOPE Alliance was a non-profit and influential Network Equipment provider (NEP) industry group aimed at standardizing "carrier-grade" systems for telecom in the Information Age, successfully in accelerating the NEP transformation towards Carrier-grade Open Source Hardware, OS, Middleware, Virtualization, and Cloud see table:

SCOPE drives NEP Supply Chain transformation to open carrier-grade standards
Technology	Suppliers	Open Standards	SCOPE Achievements
Hardware	TEMs	PCI-SIG	ATCA, MicroTCA, AdvancedMC, NEPs, Commercial off-the-shelf
Virtualization	Proprietary	Vmware. JVM	White papers, ETSI Network function virtualization, JSR319.
OS	RTOS	Open Source Development Labs, Free Standards Group	CGL, Linux Foundation
HA Middleware	Proprietary	Service Availability Forum, AIS, HPI	OpenSAF, OpenHPI.
Cloud computing	Proprietary	AWS, Google, etc.	White paper.
Supported Latest version

== NFV, SDN, 5G, Cloud transformation Age ==
From 2010 onwards, Telecom carriers (NEP customers) wanted direct involvement in driving transformation. The NEP-only SCOPE Alliance was retired, as the industry combined forces on Service Availability, ETSI Network function virtualization standardization, Software-defined networking adoption, and 5G network slicing initiatives.
