= SCOPE Alliance =

The SCOPE Alliance was a non-profit and influential Network Equipment provider (NEP) industry group aimed at standardizing "carrier-grade" systems for telecom in the Information Age. The SCOPE Alliance was founded in January 2006 by a group of NEP's, including Alcatel, Ericsson, Motorola, NEC, Nokia, and Siemens. In 2007, it added significantly to its membership.

== Mission ==
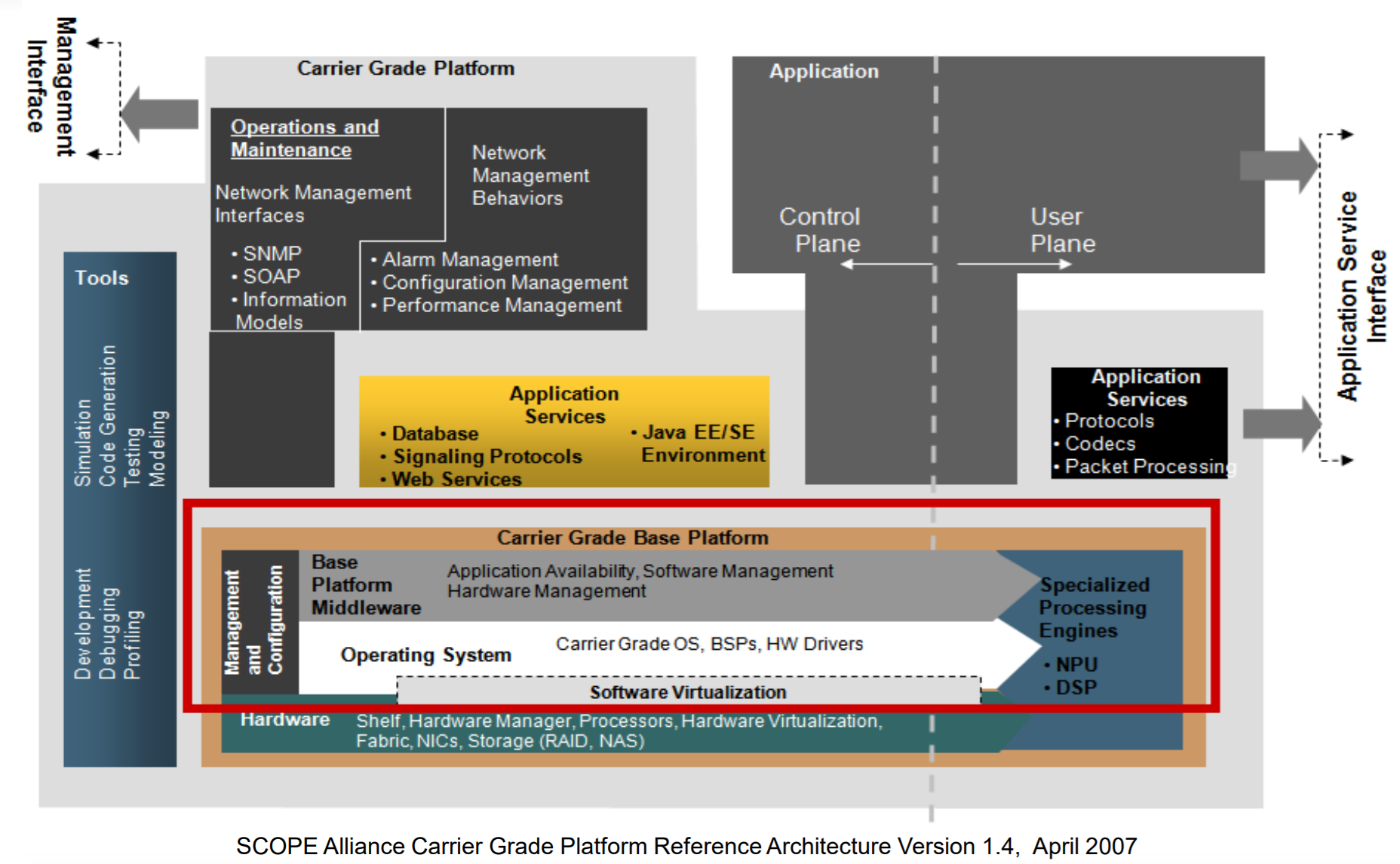
Carrier Grade Platform Reference Architecture V1.4 2007

Active between 2006 and 2012, its mission was to enable and promote the availability of open carrier-grade base platforms based on commercial off-the-shelf (COTS) hardware/software and free and open-source software building blocks, and promote interoperability between such components. SCOPE wanted to accelerate the deployment of carrier-grade base platforms (CGBP) for service provider applications so that NEP's could use them to build better solutions for their customers. By 2011, SCOPE achieved its aim, having accelerated innovation in carrier-grade communications technology and ATCA,

NEPs sell integrated hardware/software systems to carriers, with three Computing supply chains (Hardware, Operating system, and Middleware) with well-established industry groups promoting interoperability between products from different vendors. SCOPE published "profiles" aimed at influencing specification groups to focus on the needs of NEP customers (carriers). While SCOPE's focused on open standards like ATCA and Carrier Grade Linux, there is no reason "Proprietary Supplier" could not adopt the SCOPE standards.

== Open Source Achievements ==
SCOPE's influence on adapting 'Open Standards' for carrier-grade open-source standards and software is summarized in the table:

SCOPE drives NEP Supply Chain transformation to open carrier-grade standards
Technology	Suppliers	Standards	SCOPE Achievements
Hardware	TEMs	PCI-SIG	ATCA, MicroTCA, AdvancedMC, NEPs, Commercial off-the-shelf
Virtualization	Proprietary	VMware, JVM	White papers, ETSI Network function virtualization, JSR319
OS	RTOS	Open Source Development Labs, Free Standards Group	CGL, Linux Foundation
HA Middleware	Proprietary	Service Availability Forum, AIS, HPI	OpenSAF, OpenHPI
Cloud computing	Proprietary	AWS, Google, etc.	White paper
Supported Latest version

== NFV, SDN, 5G, Cloud transformation Age ==
SCOPE was also interested in advancing Network virtualization ("As a consortium of NEPs, it is important for SCOPE to address the lack of standardization in the area of virtualization"), publishing white papers on hardware virtualization, and a white paper on Java Virtualization describing "an environment where high availability Java EE and native application can co-exist and be supervised in the same fashion in a clustered environment". In 2010 SCOPE organized workshop to discuss the effect of Cloud Computing on traditional Carrier-Grade Platforms and telecom networks, publishing a Cloud Computing white paper in 2011.

SCOPE was placed into "hibernation", effectively retired, by NEPs in January 2012. Telecom carriers (NEP customers) wanted direct involvement in driving transformation, so instead, both groups combined forces on ETSI Network function virtualization standardization, Software-defined networking adoption, and 5G network slicing initiatives.

== Publications ==
SCOPE published various publications, including the following:

- SCOPE: Technical Position Paper (2008).
- Virtualization for Carrier-Grade Telecommunications Solution (2008).
- Virtualization: State of the Art (2008): focuses on system virtualization.
- Virtualization: Use Cases (2008).
- Virtualization: Requirements (2008)
- CPU Benchmarking Recommendations v1.0 (2009).
- Carrier Grade Base Platform (CGBP) (2009): Middleware reference standard.
- MW Portability: Use Cases (2009).
- JSR 319: Availability Management for Java - Java Community (2010).
- Carrier Grade Requirements for Cloud Computing: A SCOPE Alliance Perspective presented to the 2011 OpenSAF Conference.
- Telecom Grade Cloud Computing v1.0, white paper (2011), describing the characteristics of cloud computing usable for carrier-grade services.

== See also ==
- OpenSAF
- OpenHPI
- Cloud computing
- Network functions virtualization
- Network equipment providers
- Linux Foundation
