= OpenHPI =

OpenHPI or openHPI may refer to:

- openHPI (Online Education), an online platform for massive open online courses (MOOC): computer science and information technology.
- OpenHPI (Service Availability) software implementation of the Hardware Platform Interface for Service Availability.
