= Service Availability Forum =

- Company type: Private 501(c)(6)
- Industry: Technology
- Founded: 2001
- Headquarters: Beaverton, Oregon, USA
- Website: https://www.associationvoice.com/16627

The Service Availability Forum (SAF or SA Forum) is a consortium that develops, publishes, educates on and promotes open specifications for carrier-grade and mission-critical systems. Formed in 2001, it promotes development and deployment of commercial off-the-shelf (COTS) technology.

== Description ==
Service availability is an extension of high availability, referring to services that are available regardless of hardware, software or user fault and importance.

Key principles of service availability:

- Redundancy – "backup" capability in case of need to failover due to a fault
- Stateful and seamless recovery from failures
- Minimization of mean time to repair (MTTR) – time to restore service after an outage
- Fault prediction & avoidance – take action before something fails

The traditional definitions of high availability have their roots in hardware systems where redundancy of equipment was the primary mechanism for achieving uptime over a specific period. As software has come to dominate the landscape, the probability of failure is often much higher for applications than it is for hardware and so these concepts have been extended encompass an overall view of service availability where downtime, irrespective of its cause, is an exceptionally rare event. Services and applications should always be available, whether it is during abnormal system operation, scheduled maintenance, or software upgrade, for example.

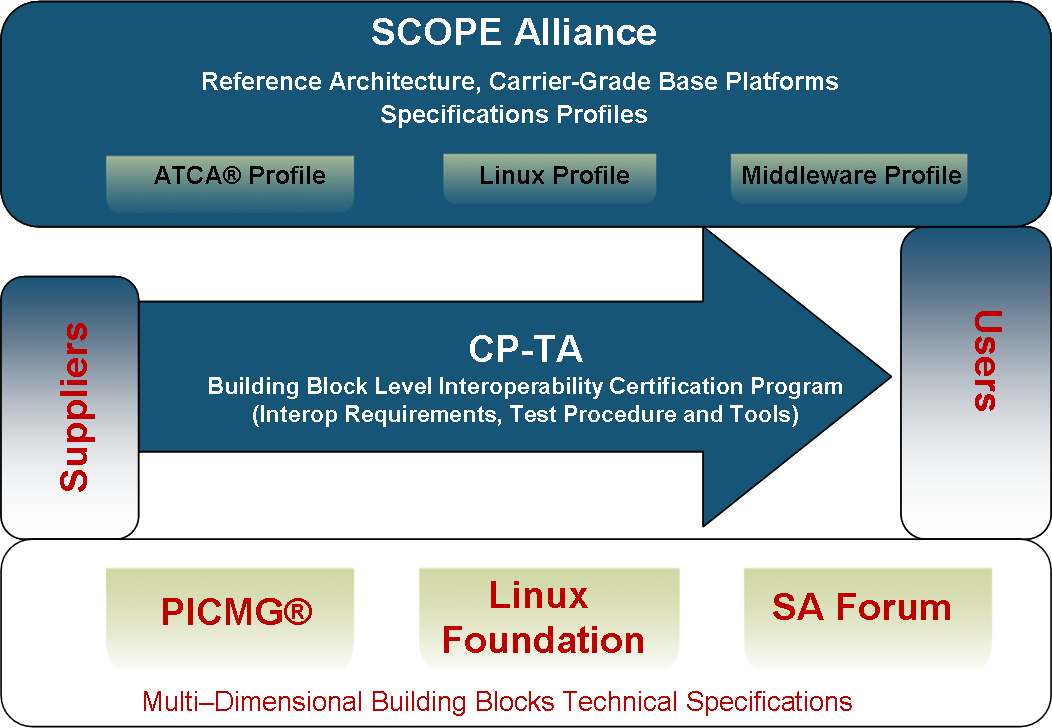
COTS "ecosystem" diagram

SA Forum support commercial off-the-shelf (COTS) technology for uninterrupted service availability, application portability and seamless integration. Collaborating industry organizations include the following:

- CP-TA (Communications Platforms Trade Association): ensure interoperability on xTCA platforms.
- PICMG (PCI Industrial Computer Manufacturers Group): develop open specifications that adapt PCI technology for use in high-performance telecommunications and industrial computing applications.
- SCOPE Alliance: enable and promote the availability of open carrier grade base platforms based on COTS hardware / software and Free and open-source software (FOSS) building blocks, and to promote interoperability between such components.
- The Linux Foundation: promote, protect, and standardize Linux by providing unified resources and services needed for open source to successfully compete with closed platforms.

=== Specifications ===
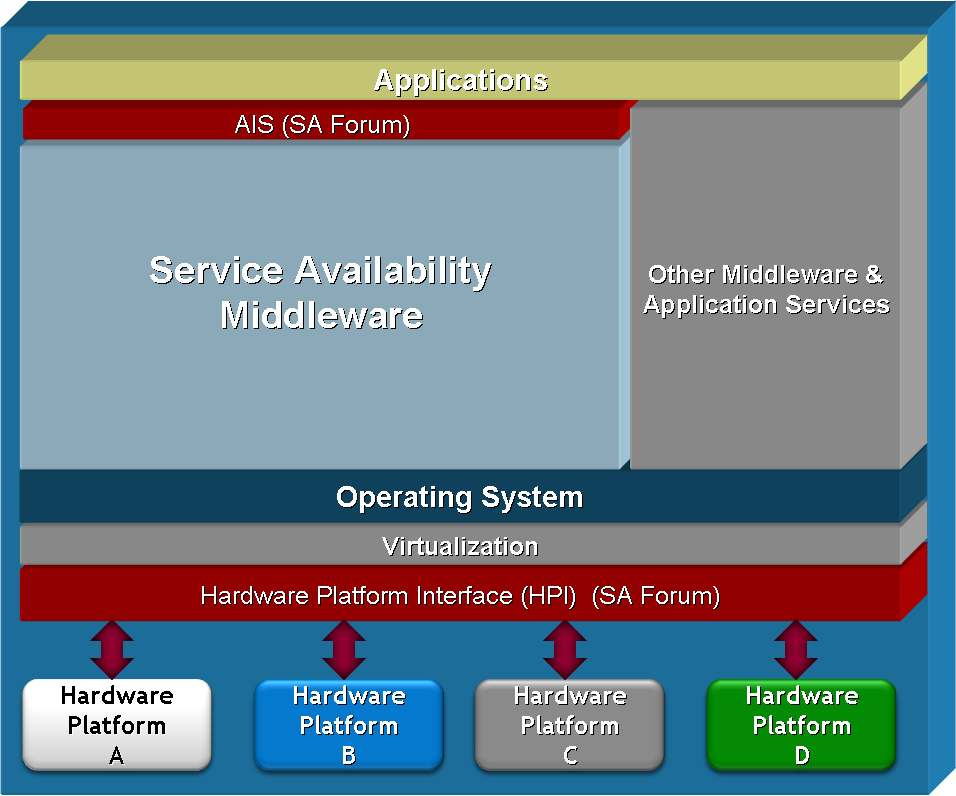
SA Forum enabled COTS platform

Specifications for carrier-grade service availability include:

- Hardware Platform Interface (HPI)
- Application Interface Specification (AIS)
- Mapping Specifications
  - Java Mapping Specifications
  - HPI-to-AdvancedTCA Mapping Specifications

=== Educational resources ===
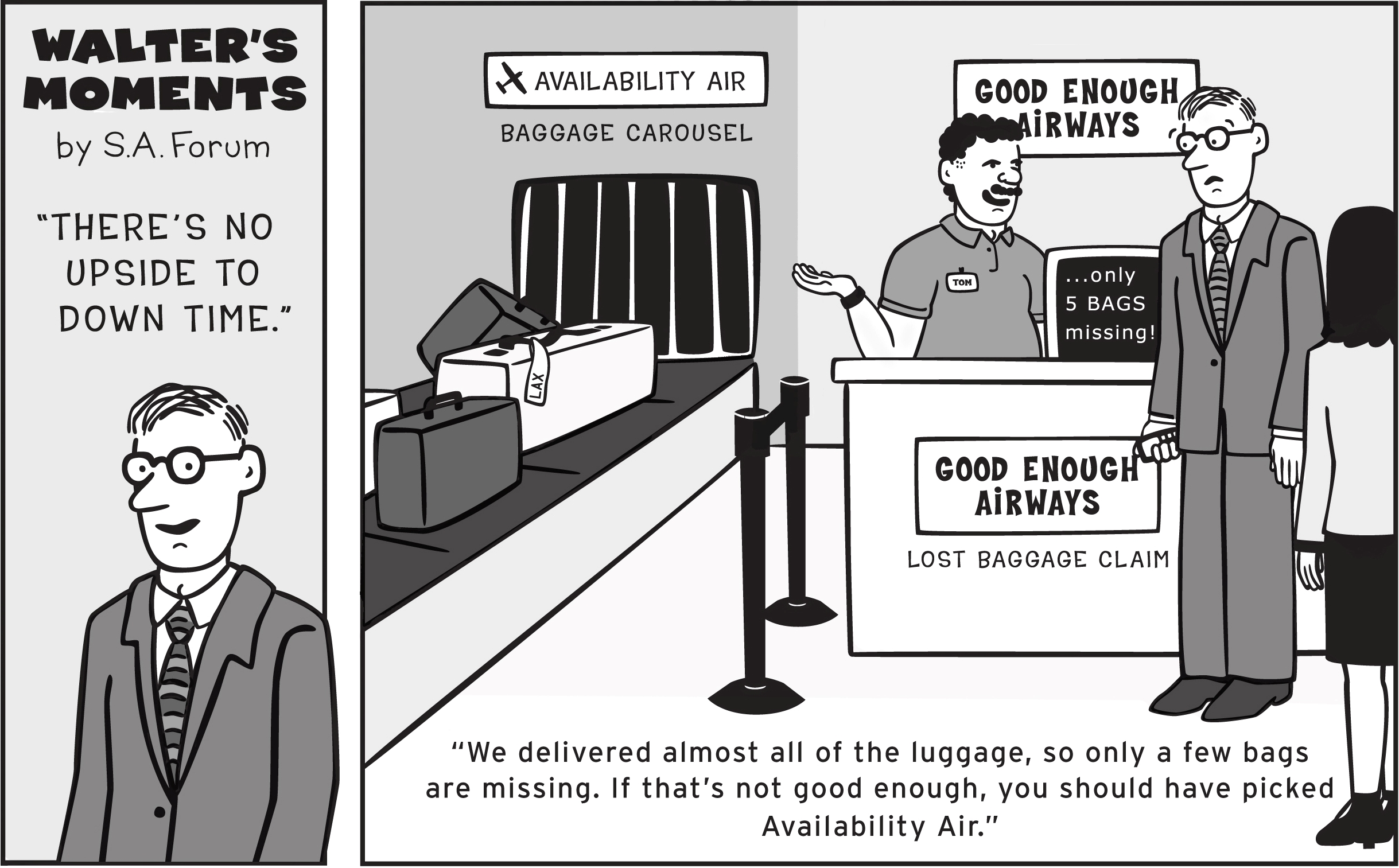
The SA Forum’s Walter’s Moments cartoon series helps explain the benefits of service availability to a wider audience.

The SA Forum free educational materials enable self-guided training the SA Forum specifications:

- Application Webcasts
- Tutorials
- Whitepapers

== See also ==
- High availability
- Commercial off-the-shelf
- Advanced Telecommunications Computing Architecture (ATCA)
- Communications Platforms Trade Association
- PICMG
- SCOPE Alliance
- SAFplus
- The Linux Foundation
- OpenSAF
- OpenHPI
- Hardware Platform Interface
- Application Interface Specification
