= MicroTCA =

Computing standard

MicroTCA (short for Micro Telecommunications Computing Architecture, also: μTCA) is a modular, open standard, created and maintained by the PCI Industrial Computer Manufacturers Group (PICMG). It provides the electrical, mechanical, thermal and management specifications to create a switched fabric computer system, using Advanced Mezzanine Cards (AMC), connected directly to a backplane. MicroTCA is a descendant of the AdvancedTCA standard.

== History ==
The rapid expansion of mobile telecommunications and their associated services (such as text messages) at the beginning of the millennium increased the demand of processing power in telecommunication systems. The existing "carrier grade" (see RAS) computing architectures were not fit to house the high performance processors of the time. In order to answer those demands, about 100 companies worked together in PICMG, resulting in the Advanced Telecommunications Architecture (AdvancedTCA, ATCA), published in 2002.

After the introduction of AdvancedTCA, a standard was developed, to cater towards smaller telecommunications systems at the edge of the network. This standard was geared towards a more compact, less expensive systems, without cutting back on reliability or data throughput. This standard, called MicroTCA, was ratified 2006.

MicroTCA systems migrated after its release into non-telecommunication sectors, like defence, avionics and science. This resulted in extensions to the base-standard, called modules.

== Modules ==
=== MicroTCA.0 ===
The base-specification for properties common to all other modules, ratified July 6, 2006. This includes:

- Mechanical specifications, like possible dimensions of card cages, backplanes and supported AMC-modules
- Electrical specifications, like power distribution and interface layout
- Thermal specifications, like possible cooling layouts or available cooling power
- Management specifications

A second revision of the base-specifications was ratified January 16, 2020, containing some corrections, as well as alterations, necessary to implement higher speed Ethernet fabrics, like 10GBASE-KR and 40GBASE-KR4.

=== MicroTCA.1 ===
This module adds specifications for ruggedized systems, using forced air for cooling. Possible scenarios for MicroTCA.1-based systems include outside plant telecom, industrial and aerospace environments

=== MicroTCA.2 ===
This module adds specifications for more stringent requirements with regards to temperature, shock, vibration and other environmental conditions. These specifications are geared towards use in outside plant telecom, machine and transport industry, as well as military airborne, shipboard and ground mobile equipment. MicroTCA.2 allows the use of air- and conduction-cooled AMC-modules.

=== MicroTCA.3 ===
This module adds specifications for even more stringent requirements with regards to temperature, shock, vibration and other environmental conditions. These specifications are geared towards use in outside plant telecom, machine and transport industry, as well as military airborne, shipboard and ground mobile equipment. MicroTCA.3 requires the use of conduction-cooled AMC-modules.

=== MicroTCA.4 ===
This module extends the AMC with a Rear Transition Module (RTM), increasing PCB-space and modularity. AMC and RTM are connected with a connector, located in zone 3, defined in MicroTCA.0. These specifications are geared towards use in large-scale scientific devices, like particle accelerators or telescopes.

== Components of MicroTCA ==
=== Card Cage ===
The card cage (also: shelf, crate) houses all the other components and as such has two primary functions:

- Provide mechanical stability to the other components
- Ensure sufficient cooling

There exist a wide array of card cages. They usually differ in:

- the type of modules they support (MTCA.0, MTCA.1, ...)
- the number of slots they provide (typically between 2 and 12)
- the architecture of the installed backplane (see below)
- the cooling scheme they use (i.e. airflow front-to-back, bottom-to-top, side-to-side, conductive,...)

=== Backplane ===
The backplane is a printed circuit board, mounted directly into the card cage. It connects all other components of a MicroTCA system to each other and provides power, data access and management access to them.

Two types of power are distributed over the backplane, Management Power (+3.3 V) and Payload Power (+12 V). Unlike typical backplanes, where power is distributed to all components via a common "powerplane" in the PCB, on a MicroTCA backplane, Management and Payload Power are distributed to each component individually. While Management Power is provided to each module connected to a powered backplane, Payload Power has to be granted by the MicroTCA Carrier Hub (MCH), after ensuring that the module is MicroTCA-compatible.

The standard defines various communication buses, which the backplane can/should provide:

- Gigabit Ethernet
- IPMI
- SATA
- Fat pipe (can be used for PCIe, SRIO or 10G/40G Ethernet)
- Point to Point Links
- Clocks
- JTAG

=== Cooling Unit ===
The Cooling Unit (CU) provides controlled air flow in air-flow-cooled card cages. It usually consists of an array of fans and a controller, which is connected to the backplane. The MicroTCA Carrier Hub (MCH) can read-out temperature sensors (if present) and fan speed, as well as change fan speed via IPMI. The Cooling Unit is usually fitted to a specific card cage. Some CUs are easily detachable (i.e. for cleaning or replacement), while other card cages come with integrated, non-detachable CUs.

=== Power Module ===
The Power Module (PM, also: Power Supply) converts the AC power from the power line to the +3.3 V Management Power (MP) and +12 V Payload Power (PP), both of which are DC. There exist a variety of power modules, which differ in:

- form factor (i.e. double width, single width)
- input voltage (110 V, 220 V, both)
- output power (i.e. 600 W, 1000 W)

The power module senses the presence of a module in a slot via a specified pin in the module connector, and immediately provides that module with management power. Payload power is managed by the MicroTCA Carrier Hub (MCH), which communicates with the power module via IPMI.

The power module uses its own type of connector, and can thus only be installed into designated slots, which in turn can't carry any other type of module. Some card cages provide an additional power module slot for redundancy. In such a case, one slot is the primary, which will provide power by default, and the other one is secondary, providing power only, if the primary does not.

=== MicroTCA Carrier Hub ===
The MicroTCA Carrier Hub (MCH) is the central managing device of a MicroTCA card cage. It manages power distribution and cooling. It usually also provides Gigabit Ethernet and/or PCIe/Serial RapidIO switching. Some MCHs additionally provide clocking. As the name indicates, they are the hub of various star topologies (i.e. for Ethernet, PCIe) on the backplane and thus require dedicated slot(s). Some backplanes support two MCHs for redundancy. In this case there are two MCH slots, with one being designated primary, and one secondary.

=== Advanced Mezzanine Card ===
Advanced Mezzanine Card (AMC) is a standard for hot-pluggable PCBs. It was originally developed to be used in AdvancedTCA systems. The standard specifies:

- the dimensions of the PCB with two width variants (single, double) and three height variants (Compact, Mid-size, Full)
- type, location and orientation of connectors (i.e. Zone 1, 2, 3)

There is a huge variation of functionalities, an AMC can fulfill:

- Computing (i.e. a module with CPU, RAM, SSD and on-board graphics)
- Storage (i.e. SSD carrier)
- Graphics card
- FPGA card (i.e. for signal processing)
- FMC carrier
- Digitizer card (Analog-Digital and Digital-Analog Conversion)
- Clocking and Triggering
- and others

=== Rear Transition Module (MTCA.4 only) ===
The Rear Transition Module (RTM) was added in the MicroTCA.4 standard. It is connected directly to an AMC via a connector, located in zone 3, requiring a double width AMC and RTM. An RTM has about the same dimensions, as an AMC, basically doubling the available PCB-space per slot in an MTCA.4 card cage. Its power is provided by the AMC. Thus an RTM can not operate on its own, but requires a paired AMC.

The zone 3 connector is electrically free configurable, making it possible, that a mechanically fitting AMC-RTM pair is electrically incompatible. To avoid damage due to that incompatibility, a mechanical code-pin was added to MTCA.4-compatible AMCs and RTMs, mechanically preventing the installation of an electrically incompatible RTM to an AMC.

The functionality of RTMs includes, but is not limited to:

- RF-signal pre-/post-processing (i.e. filtering, Up-/Down-conversion, Vector De-/Modulation)
- Digital signal pre-/post-processing
- Clock-generation/-distribution
- Device interfaces
- Date storage
- CPU (only MCH-RTM)
