= Advanced Mezzanine Card =

Printed circuit boards

Advanced Mezzanine Cards are printed circuit boards (PCBs) that follow a specification of the PCI Industrial Computers Manufacturers Group (PICMG). Known as AdvancedMC or AMC, the official specification designation is AMC.x. Originally AMC was targeted to requirements for carrier grade communications equipment, but later used in other markets.

AMC modules are designed to work standalone, hot pluggable on any carrier card (base boards and system carrier boards in AdvancedTCA Systems) or as a hot pluggable board into a backplane directly as defined by MicroTCA specifications. The AMC standard differs from other mezzanine card standards such as PCI Mezzanine Card (PMC), PCIexpress Mezzanine Card XMC and FMC – FPGA Mezzanine Card by the 0 degree instead of 90 degree orientation of its connector enabling hot plug of the AMC.

== Specifications ==
- AMC.0 is the "base" or "core" specification. The AdvancedMC definition alone defines a protocol agnostic connector to connect to a carrier card or a backplane. Intermediate revisions are known as engineering change notices, or ECNs.

R1.0 adopted January 3, 2005
ECN-001 adopted June 2006
R2.0 adopted November 15, 2006

An AMC card can use proprietary LVDS-based signaling, or one of the following AMC specifications:

- AMC.1 PCI Express (and PCI Express Advanced Switching) (ratified)
- AMC.2 Gigabit Ethernet and XAUI (ratified)
- AMC.3 Storage (ratified)
- AMC.4 Serial RapidIO (ratified)

== Sizes ==
There are six types of AMC cards ("Module") available. A Full-size Module is the most common, allowing up to 23.25 mm high components (from centerline of PCB). A Mid-size Module allows component heights maxed at 11.65 to 14.01 mm (depending on board location). A Compact Module allows only 8.18 mm.

== AMCs used in AdvancedTCA systems ==
To use AMCs in ATCA-systems a special carrier card known as hybrid or cutaway carrier is required to hold one Full-size Module or two Compact-size (see connectors below). Each height is paired with a width, single or double, describing how many carrier slots the board fills. A double width card allows more component space, but does not provide any additional power or bandwidth because it only uses a single connector.

The pinout of the AMC electrical connector on an ATCA-AMC carrier or motherboard is fairly complex, with up to 170 signal traces. There are four different lengths the traces can be, which allows hot swapping by knowing in advance which traces will become active in which order upon insertion. To help reduce cost for mass production, a card may only require the traces on one side (pins 1 to 85). The possibility of using only half the pin locations, combined with various height combinations, results in four different connector types that are available on the carrier card:

Connector Style	Pins	Mating Card Type
B	85	One module that only needs pins 1-85
B+	170	One module card that uses all available pins (1–170)
AB	170	Two adjacent modules that each only need pins 1-85
A+B+	340	Two adjacent modules that use all available pins (1–170)

Bay sizes:

Bay	Aperture	Connector	Compact Module	Mid-size Module	Full-size Module
Compact Conventional Bay	3	B, B+	Slot B	-	-
Mid-size Conventional Bay	4	B, B+	Convert face plate to mid-size	Slot B	-
Single Slot Cutaway Bay	6	B, B+	Convert face plate to full-size	Convert face plate to full-size	Slot B
Dual Slot Cutaway Bay	6	AB, A+B+	Slots A and B	Convert face plate to full-size	Slot B

== AMCs used in MicroTCA systems ==
The AdvancedMC card is considered powerful enough that there are situations where the processing functionality is the only requirement. The MicroTCA standard is targeted at supplying a COTS chassis that will allow AMC cards to function without any AdvancedTCA carrier card. The function of the ATCA carrier board and of the ATCA shelf manager are concentrated on one board, which is called the MicroTCA Carrier Hub (MCH). On July 6, 2006, MicroTCA R1.0 was approved. Since this approval, companies like Advantech, Kontron, N.A.T., Annapolis Micro Systems, VadaTech Inc., have launched AMC and MCH products.

Versions of MicroTCA with fewer AdvancedMC card slots are informally known as NanoTCA and PicoTCA.
