= Carrier grade =

Telecommunications capability rating

In telecommunications, a "carrier grade" or "carrier class" refers to a system, or a hardware or software component that is extremely reliable, well tested and proven in its capabilities. Carrier grade systems are tested and engineered to meet or exceed "five nines" high availability standards, and provide very fast fault recovery through redundancy (normally less than 50 milliseconds).

"Carrier grade" is not a standard or very clearly defined term but, rather, a set of features and qualities that make the product acceptable by a carrier. The feature set that enables the carrier to utilize the business with use of that equipment are: high quality and very good MTBF (some requirements are stated in TR-144 chapter 7.17), redundancy (if one part goes down, there is an alternative), easy and cost-efficient operations and maintenance (O&M), all of which are standardized as much as possible.

== See also ==
- Real-time computing
- Redundancy (engineering)
- Carrier system
- High availability
