= System on module =

Board-level circuit that integrates a system function in a single module

Typical SoC use in a system on a module circuit board

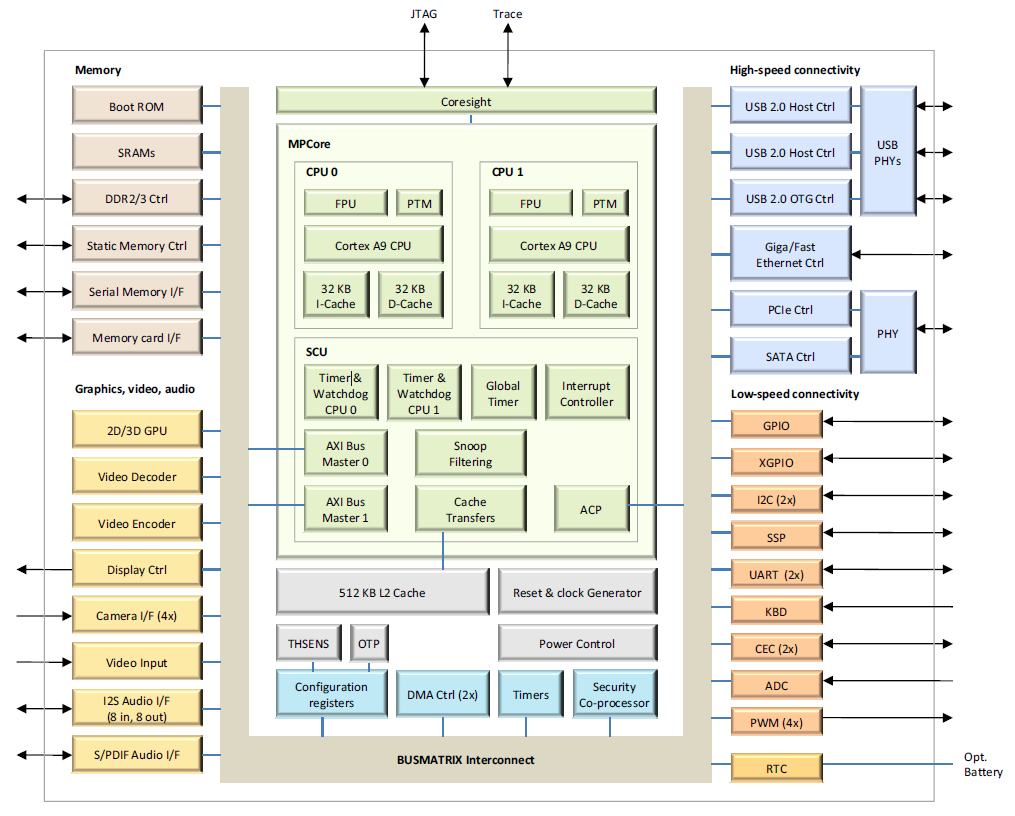
SoM block diagram example

A system on a module (SoM) is a board-level circuit that integrates a system function in a single module. It may integrate digital and analog functions on a single board. A typical application is in the area of embedded systems. Unlike a single-board computer, a SoM serves a special function like a system on a chip (SoC). The devices integrated in the SoM typically require a high level of interconnection for reasons such as speed, timing, bus width, etc. There are benefits in building a SoM, as for SoC; one notable result is to reduce the cost of the base board or the main PCB. Two other major advantages of SoMs are design-reuse and that they can be integrated into many embedded computer applications.

== History ==
The acronym SoM has its roots in the blade-based modules. In the mid-1980s, when VMEbus blades used M-Modules, these were commonly referred to as system On a module (SoM). These SoMs performed specific functions such as compute functions and data acquisition functions. SoMs were used extensively by Sun Microsystems, Motorola, Xerox, DEC, and IBM in their blade computers.

== Design ==
A typical SoM consists of:

- at least one microcontroller, microprocessor or digital signal processor (DSP) core
  - multiprocessor systems-on-chip (MPSoCs) have more than one processor core
- memory blocks including a selection of ROM, RAM, EEPROM and/or flash memory
- timing sources
- industry standard communication interfaces such as USB, FireWire, Ethernet, USART, SPI, I²C
- peripherals including counter-timers, real-time timers and power-on reset generators
- analog interfaces including analog-to-digital converters and digital-to-analog converters
- voltage regulators and power management circuits

== See also ==
- CompactPCI – Computer bus interconnect for industrial computers
- Futurebus – Universal computer bus standard
- PCI Mezzanine Card – Printed circuit board assembly manufactured to the IEEE P1386.1 standard
- VPX – Standards for connecting components of a computer
- VXS – VMEbus performance improvement standard
