= Hybricon Corporation =

- Company type: Subsidiary
- Industry: Defense and Aerospace
- Founded: 1976
- Fate: Acquired
- Headquarters: Littleton, Massachusetts, United States
- Products: Custom Enclosures and Backplanes
- Number of employees: 100
- Parent: Celestica
- Website: www.hybricon.com

Hybricon Corporation is a provider of systems packaging serving the military, aerospace, homeland security, medical and high-end Industrial markets and develops embedded computing systems using OpenVPX, VPX, VXS, VMEbus, VME64X, CompactPCI, rugged MicroTCA, and custom bus structures.

== History ==
Charles Michael Hayward, who was born in Argentina in 1928, started a consulting business in his basement in 1976, and incorporated as Hybricon Corporation in 1978 as business grew. They were originally located in Littleton, Massachusetts, and sold wire wrap products by 1979. In September 2000, Paul R. Freve was appointed as president, after Hayward served for 22 years.

Hybricon is a member of the PCI Industrial Computer Manufacturers Group (PICMG) through 2008, VMEbus International Trade Association (VITA), and member of the OpenVPX Industry Working Standards Group when it formed in 2009. Hybricon along with Curtiss-Wright were the first to demonstrate a live OpenVPX System at the trade show Milcom in Boston in October 2009. The system included an OpenVPX backplane in a Hybricon SFF-4 Small Form Factor conduction-cooled chassis with Curtiss-Wright Control small form factor 3U cards.

In 2010, Curtiss-Wright Controls Electronic Systems acquired Hybricon for $19 million in cash. At the time it was based in Ayer, Massachusetts. It became the engineered packaging business unit. Hybricon was estimated to have $17 million per year in sales at the time. By the end of 2010. it announced a thermal management technology called CoolWall.

In 2015, Atrenne Integrated Solutions acquired the assets of Hybricon from Curtiss-Wright. Based in Minneapolis, Atrenne was formed in 2014 from a merger of AbelConn Electronics, CBT Technology, Photo Etch, and SIE Computing Solutions. It was led by Jan Erik Mathiesen at the time. In April, 2018, Toronto-based Celestica acquired Atrenne, after announcing the agreement in January.

== See also ==
- List of United States defense contractors
- Systems integrator
- Government contractor
