= AXIe =

AdvancedTCA Extensions for Instrumentation and Test (AXIe) is a modular instrumentation standard created by Aeroflex, Keysight Technologies, and Test Evolution Corporation. (In October 2008, Aeroflex had purchased a 40% shareholding in Test Evolution.)

AXIe was targeted for general-purpose instrumentation and semiconductor test. AXIe is based on standards from AdvancedTCA (ATCA), PXI, LAN eXtensions for Instrumentation (LXI), and Interchangeable Virtual Instruments (IVI). AXIe was formally launched on November 10, 2009.

Additional members joining the AXIe Consortium were: Viavi Solutions, Guzik Technical Enterprises (December 2009), Giga-tronics (January 2010), ADLINK Technology, Conduant (2019), Elma Electronic, Samtec, Informtest, Power Value Technologies, Synopsis and Modular Methods.

In October, 2017, the AXIe consortium announced a new specification, Optical Data Interface (ODI), suitable for high-speed instrumentation systems addressing challenging applications in 5G communications, mil/aero, and advanced communication research. The new standard enables a 20 GB/s (160 Gbit/s) data transfer connection between instruments and/or data recorders using multi-mode optical fibers.
