= Ezurio =

US wireless connectivity technology company

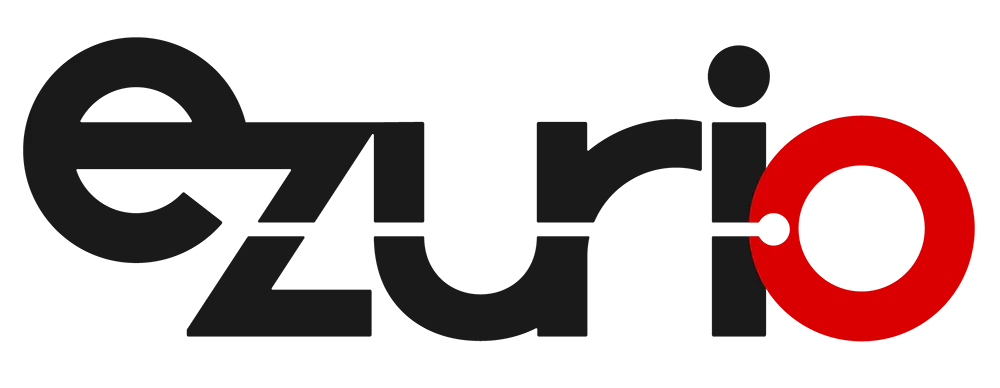
- Company type: Private
- Industry: Wireless connectivity, IoT hardware
- Founded: 2004
- Headquarters: Akron, Ohio
- Products: Wireless modules, system-on-modules, single-board computers, internal antennas, IoT devices
- Number of employees: 150+
- Website: www.ezurio.com

Ezurio is a wireless connectivity technology company based in Akron, Ohio, United States. It is best known for manufacturing certified RF modules, system-on-modules (SOMs), single-board computers (SBCs), antennas, and IoT devices used in medical, industrial, and commercial applications.

== History ==
Ezurio originated in the United Kingdom in 2004 as a specialist in Bluetooth and Wi-Fi modules. The company was acquired by Laird Technologies in 2008, and its products and staff became part of Laird’s expanding connectivity division.

Laird expanded its wireless capabilities through subsequent acquisitions, including Summit Data Communications in 2012. In 2018, Advent International completed a take-private acquisition of Laird plc, under which the connectivity business operated as Laird Connectivity. The company later divested its external antenna business to TE Connectivity in 2021.

In July 2022, Laird Connectivity was sold to Audax Private Equity. That December, the company expanded its embedded compute offerings with the acquisition of Boundary Devices, a provider of system-on-modules (SoMs) and single-board computers (SBCs).

In March 2024, the company rebranded as Ezurio, uniting its connectivity and embedded computing businesses under the historic “Ezurio” name.

== Products and services ==
Ezurio develops wireless and embedded computing solutions, including:

- Wireless modules supporting Wi-Fi, Bluetooth, Ultra-Wideband, LoRaWAN, and cellular technologies.
- System on modules (SOMs) based on NXP and other platforms, including SMARC form factors.
- Single-board computers (SBCs) for industrial and medical IoT deployments.
- Internal antennas for Wi-Fi, Bluetooth, and cellular use cases.
- IoT devices such as sensors and gateways, with integrations into ecosystems like AWS and The Things Network.
- Engineering and design services covering embedded software, antenna design, and regulatory compliance.

== See also ==
- Wireless module
- Internet of things
