= Nuclear Instrumentation Module =

Standard for electronic modules used in nuclear physics research

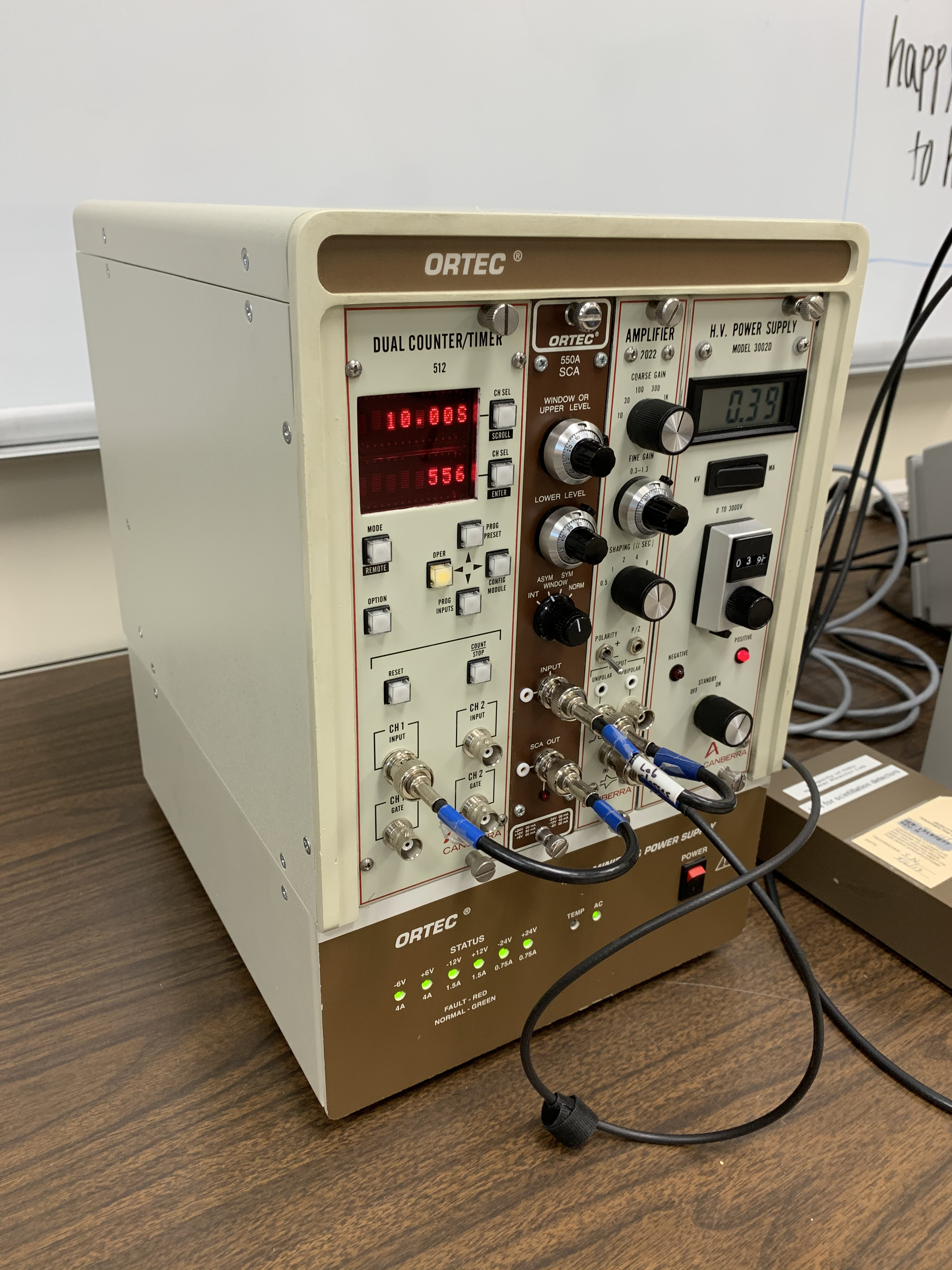
A NIM crate with a variety of modules

The Nuclear Instrumentation Module (NIM) standard defines mechanical and electrical specifications for electronics modules used in experimental particle and nuclear physics. The concept of modules in electronic systems offers enormous advantages in flexibility, interchange of instruments, reduced design effort, ease in updating and maintaining the instruments.

The NIM standard is one of the first (and perhaps the simplest) such standards. First defined by the U.S. Atomic Energy Commission's report TID-20893 in 1968–1969, NIM was most recently revised in 1990 (DOE/ER-0457T). It provides a common footprint for electronic modules (amplifiers, ADCs, DACs, CFDs, etc.), which plug into a larger chassis (NIM crate, or NIM bin). The crate must supply ±12 and ±24 volts DC power to the modules via a backplane; the standard also specifies ±6 V DC and 220 V or 110 V AC pins, but not all NIM bins provide them. Mechanically, NIM modules must have a minimum standard width of 1.35 in (34 mm), a maximum faceplate height of 8.7 in (221 mm) and depth of 9.7 in (246 mm). They can, however, also be built in multiples of this standard width, that is, double-width, triple-width etc.

The NIM standard also specifies cabling, connectors, impedances and levels for logic signals. The fast logic standard (commonly known as NIM logic) is a current-based logic, negative "true" (at −16 mA into 50 ohms = −0.8 volts) and 0 mA for "false"; an ECL-based logic is also specified. Apart from the above-mentioned mechanical/physical and electrical specifications/restrictions, the individual is free to design their module in any way desired, thus allowing for new developments and improvements for efficiency or looks/aesthetics.

NIM modules cannot communicate with each other through the crate backplane; this is a feature of later standards such as CAMAC and VMEbus. As a consequence, NIM-based ADC modules are nowadays uncommon in nuclear and particle physics. NIM is still widely used for amplifiers, discriminators, nuclear pulse generators and other logic modules that do not require digital data communication but benefit from a backplane connector that is better suited for high-power use.

== Standard pin assignments ==
NIM standard module connector pin assignments (required by DOE/ER-0457T)
Pin #	Function	Pin #	Function
1	Reserved [+3 V]	2	Reserved [−3 V]
3	Spare bus	4	Reserved bus
5	Coaxial	6	Coaxial
7	Coaxial	8	200 V DC
9	Spare	10	+6 V
11	−6 V	12	Reserved bus
13	Spare	14	Spare
15	Reserved	16	+12 V
17	−12 V	18	Spare bus
19	Reserved bus	20	Spare
21	Spare	22	Reserved
23	Reserved	24	Reserved
25	Reserved	26	Spare
27	Spare	28	+24 V
29	−24 V	30	Spare bus
31	Spare	32	Spare
33	117 V AC (hot)	34	Power-return ground
35	Reset (scaler)	36	Gate
37	Reset (aux)	38	Coaxial
39	Coaxial	40	Coaxial
41	117 V AC (neutral)	42	High-quality ground
G	Ground guide pin		

== See also ==
- BNC connectors for analog and logic signals
- Computer Automated Measurement and Control (CAMAC)
- Data acquisition
- LEMO connectors, for higher density modules
- Nuclear electronics
- RG-58 50 ohm coaxial cable for timing and logic signals
- RG-62 93 ohm coaxial cable for spectroscopy signals
- VMEbus
