= Elma Electronic =

Swiss electronics company

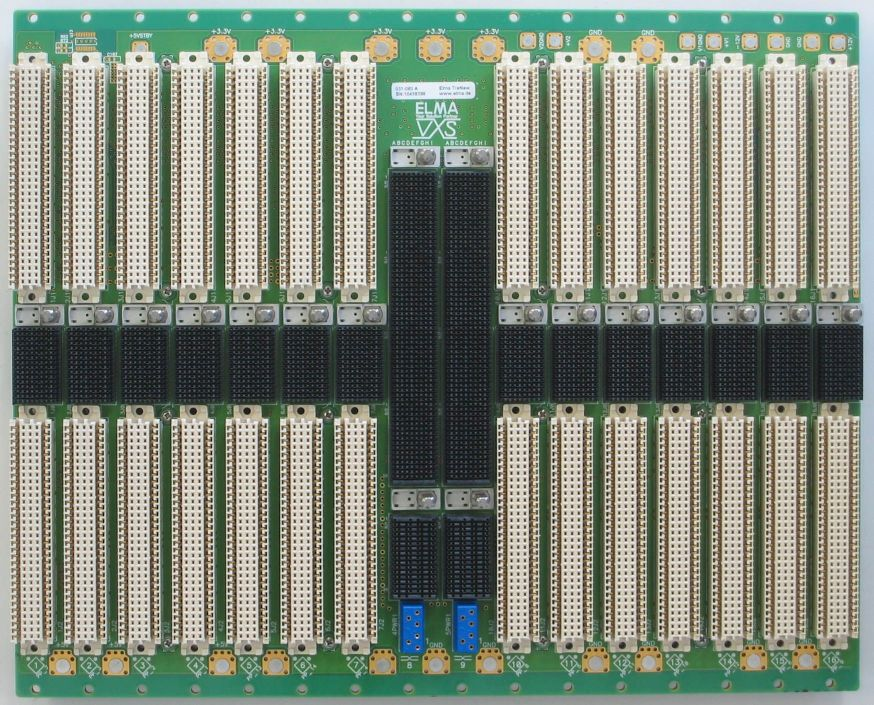
Elma VXS backplane

Elma Electronic is a publicly traded Swiss electronics company founded in 1960 and based in Wetzikon, Switzerland. The company has 5 product divisions: Systems Platforms, Backplanes, Enclosures & Components, Rotary Switches, and Cabinet Enclosures. The largest segment is systems packaging serving the military, aerospace, homeland security, medical and industrial markets. The Elma Bustronic division develops backplanes, including VME320, which was the world's fastest VME backplane in 1997. Elma Bustronic also develops backplanes in OpenVPX, VMEbus, VME64X, CompactPCI, MicroTCA, and custom bus structures. Elma is an executive member of the PCI Industrial Computer Manufacturers Group (PICMG), VME International Trade Association, and member of the OpenVPX Industry Working Standards Group.

== History ==
Elma was established in 1960 in Moenchaltorf as a sole proprietorship. In 1965 it expanded operations into Germany with the foundation of Elma Electronic AG in Munich. In 1970 the company relocated from Moenchaltorf to Wetzikon. In 1974, Elma became a wholly owned Subsidiary of Sulzer. Sulzer divested Elma in 1996 and in the same year Elma held its first Initial public offering.

Elma's locations include Wetzikon, Fremont, California, Lawrenceville, Georgia, Warminster, Pennsylvania, Pforzheim, Tel Aviv, Villemoirieu, Bedford, Bucharest, Singapore, Shanghai and Bengaluru. In 1985 and 1990, Elma founded American subsidiaries: Elma Electronic Inc. and Elma Bustronic (both based in Fremont, California). Subsidiaries in France, Israel, Romania and England were established in 2000, a subsidiary in China in 2004. In the same 2004, Elma acquired Optima EPS (Lawrenceville, Georgia) and Mektron Systems (England). In 2009, Elma acquired ACT/Technico (Warminster, Pennsylvania).

== Products ==
Elma supplies eurocard electronic enclosures since the 1960s. These enclosures are designed for standard 19” rack-mounted applications or for portable or desktop versions. From simple subracks for electronics, the company since expanded to chassis platforms for architectures such as the VMEbus. In 2009, the company acquired ACT/Technico.

Elma enclosures are centered on 19” and 23” Eurocard specification, primarily for VME/ VME64x, CompactPCI, VXS/VPX, VXI/PXI, AdvancedTCA/MicroTCA and other architectures. Elma supplies these products either pre-assembled or un-assembled. Elma is currently an executive member of the PICMG consortium
