= Versatile Service Engine =

Versatile Service Engine is a second generation IP Multimedia Subsystem developed by Nortel Networks that is compliant with Advanced Telecommunications Computing Architecture specifications. Nortel's versatile service engine provides capability to telecommunication service provider to offer global System for mobile communications and code-division multiple access services in both wireline and Wireless mode.

== History ==
The Versatile Service Engine is a joint effort of Nortel and Motorola. The aim of collaboration was to develop an Advanced Telecommunications Computing Architecture compliant platform for Nortel IP Multimedia Subsystem applications. Nortel joined the PCI Industrial Computer Manufacturers Group in 2002 and the work on Versatile Service Engine was started in 2004.

== Architecture ==
A single versatile service engine frame consists of three shelves, each shelf having three slots. A single slot can have many sub-slots staging a blade in it. Advanced Telecommunications Computing Architecture blades can be processors, switches, AMC carriers, etc. A typical shelf will contain one or more switch blades and several processor blades. The power supply and cooling fans are located in the back pane of the Versatile Service Engine.

== Ericsson ownership ==
After Nortel Networks filed for bankruptcy protection in January 2009, Ericsson telecommunications then acquired the code-division multiple access and LTE based assets of then Canada's largest telecom equipment maker, hence taking the ownership of Versatile service engine.
