= Serial FPDP =

Serial Front Panel Data Port(Serial FPDP or SFPDP) is a high speed low latency data streaming serial communication protocol. It currently supports several distinct speeds:

- 1.0625 Gbit/s
- 2.125 Gbit/s
- 2.5 Gbit/s
- 5.0 Gbit/s
- 6.25 Gbit/s
- 8.5 Gbit/s
- 10 Gbit/s
- 10.3125 Gbit/s
- 25.78125 Gbit/s

Serial FPDP also recommends the use of one of the following link widths:

- x1
- x4
- x8
- x12 (5 Gbit/s and up)
- x24 (5 Gbit/s and up)
- x48 (10 Gbit/s and up)

Serial FPDP can operate over long distances, up to 10 kilometres (6.2 mi), using optical fiber cables, or shorter distances over copper cables.

== See also ==
- Front Panel Data Port (aka parallel FPDP)
- VXI
