= Front Panel Data Port =

The front panel data port (FPDP) is a bus that provides high speed data transfer between two or more VMEbus boards at up to 160 Mbit/s with low latency. The FPDP bus uses a 32-bit parallel synchronous bus wired with an 80-conductor ribbon cable.

The following interface functions are supported:

- FPDP/TM (transmitter master) - drives data and timing signals onto the FPDP, and also terminates the bus signals at one end of the ribbon cable
- FPDP/RM (receiver master) - receives data from the FPDP synchronously with the timing signals provided by the FPDP/TM, and also terminates the bus at the opposite end of the cable to the FPDP/TM
- FPDP/R (receiver) - receives data from the FPDP synchronously with the timing signals provided by the FPDP/TM; it does not terminate the bus. More than one FPDP/R can be connected to the FPDP bus. It can also be an alternate function to that of FPDP/RM via software control.

The connector, denoted by the FPDP specification, is a KEL P/N 8825E-080-175.

== Interface signals ==
- D<31:0> : Data bus driven by FPDP/TM
- DIR_n : Active low Direction signal driven by FPDP/TM
- DVALID_n: Active low data valid indication driven by FPDP/TM
- STROBE : A free running clock supplied by FPDP/TM
- NRDY_n : Active low not ready signal driven by FPDP/R or FPDP/RM. Asserted before the commencement of transfer of data by the FPDP/R or FPDP/RM asynchronous to STROBE.
- PSTROBE : Optional Differential PECL version of the STROBE driven by FPDP/TM
- SUSPEND_n : Active low suspend signal asserted by FPDP/R or FPDP/RM asynchronous to STROBE to inform the transmitter that buffer flow condition may occur. The transmitter may delay not more than 16 clocks before it suspends the data transfer.
- SYNC_n : Active low synchronization pulse provided by FPDP/TM.
- PIO1, PIO2 : Programmable I/O lines for user purposes

== Data frames ==
The following types of data frames are supported:

- Unframed Data
- single frame Data
- Fixed size Repeating Frame Data
- Dynamic Size Repeating Frame Data

== Cable length ==
FPDP interfaces work with up to a cable length of 1 meter when used in multi-drop configuration. They work up to 2 meter when using STROBE signal during point-to-point configuration. They work up to 5 meter when used with PSTROBE differential signal during point-to-point configuration.

== See also ==
- VMEbus - a computer bus standard widely used for many applications and standardized by the IEC as ANSI/IEEE 1014-1987
- Serial FPDP - High-speed serial version of FPDP, that can be sent short distances over copper cables, or longer distances over optical fiber cable.
