= Computer Automated Measurement and Control =

Electronic standard

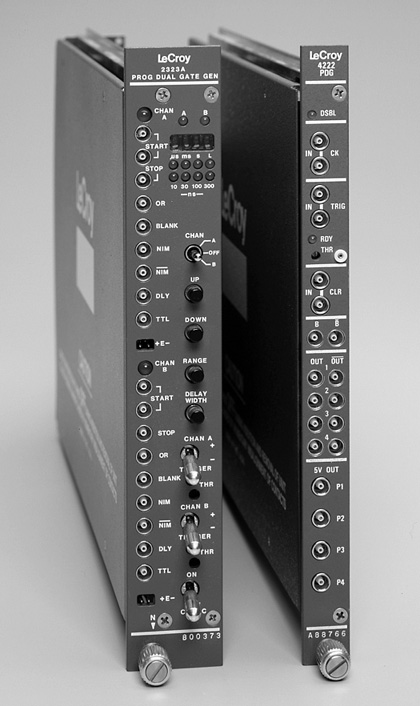
CAMAC modules made by LeCroy

Computer-Aided Measurement And Control (CAMAC) is a standard bus and modular-crate electronics standard for data acquisition and control used in particle detectors for nuclear and particle physics and in industry. The bus allows data exchange between plug-in modules (up to 24 in a single crate) and a crate controller, which then interfaces to a PC or to a VME-CAMAC interface.

The standard was originally defined by the ESONE Committee as standard EUR 4100 in 1972, and covers the mechanical, electrical, and logical elements of a parallel bus ("dataway") for the plug-in modules. Several standards have been defined for multiple crate systems, including the Parallel Branch Highway definition and Serial Highway definition. Vendor-specific Host/Crate interfaces have also been built.

The CAMAC standard encompasses IEEE standards:

- 583 The base standard
- 683 Block transfer specifications (Q-stop and Q-scan)
- 596 Parallel Branch Highway systems
- 595 Serial highway system
- 726 Real-time Basic for CAMAC
- 675 Auxiliary crate controller specification/support
- 758 FORTRAN subroutines for CAMAC.

Within the dataway, modules are addressed by slot (geographical addressing). The left-most 22 slots are available for application modules while the right-most two slots are dedicated to a crate controller. Within a slot the standard defines 16 subaddresses (0–15). A slot commanded by the controller with one of 32 function codes (0–31). Of these function codes, 0–7 are read functions and will transfer data to the controller from the addressed module, while 16–23 are write function codes which will transfer data from the controller to the module.

In addition to functions that address the module, the following global functions are defined:

- I – Crate inhibit
- Z – Crate zero
- C – Crate clear

The original standard was capable of one 24-bit data transfer every microsecond. Later a revision to the standard was released to support short cycles which allows a transfer every 450 ns. A follow on upwardly compatible standard Fast CAMAC allows the crate cycle time to be tuned to the capabilities of the modules in each slot.

The FASTBUS standard was introduced in 1984 as a replacement for CAMAC in large systems.

== Backplane physical characteristics ==
The physical connector on the back of a CAMAC module is a card-edge connector, with a receiving socket on the backplane. Because there are no alignment pins on the socket or connector, there is the possibility of connector misalignment upon module insertion. Therefore, CAMAC modules may NOT be hot-swapped. Many devices are connected to it.

== Backplane electrical characteristics ==
CAMAC shares low-voltage DC power with NIM crates. The crate supplies +6 V, −6 V, +12 V, −12 V, +24 V, and −24 V to all modules.

== See also ==
- Data acquisition
- LEMO connector standard
- NIM
- VMEbus
- FASTBUS
