= Advanced Telecommunications Computing Architecture =

Advanced Telecommunications Computing Architecture (ATCA or AdvancedTCA) is the largest specification effort in the history of the PCI Industrial Computer Manufacturers Group (PICMG), with more than 100 companies participating. Known as AdvancedTCA, the official specification designation PICMG 3.x (see below) was ratified by the PICMG organization in December 2002. AdvancedTCA is targeted primarily to requirements for "carrier grade" communications equipment, but has recently expanded its reach into more ruggedized applications geared toward the military/aerospace industries as well. This series of specifications incorporates the latest trends in high speed interconnect technologies, next-generation processors, and improved Reliability, Availability and Serviceability (RAS).

== Mechanical specifications ==
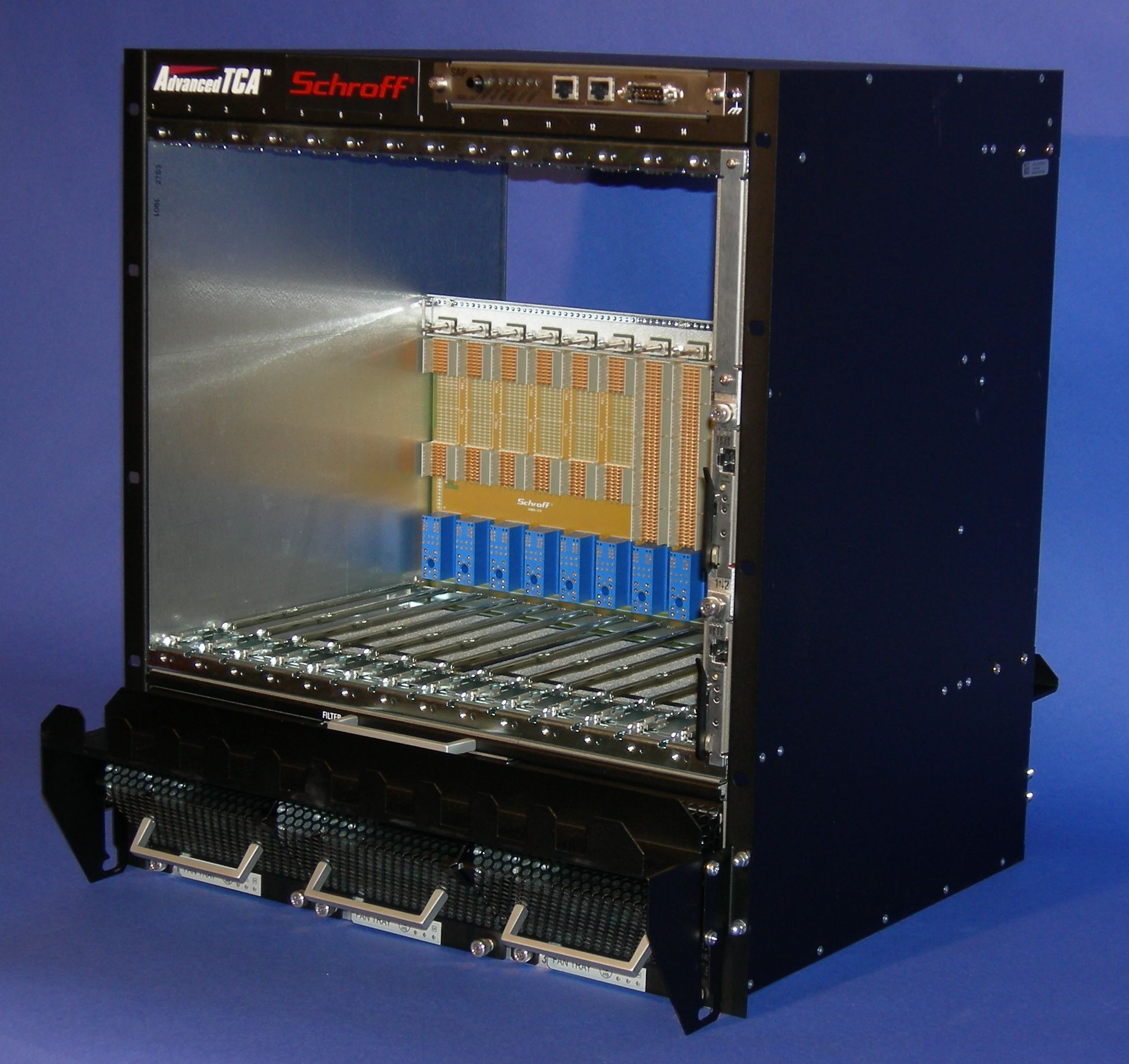
12U 14-slot AdvancedTCA shelf

An AdvancedTCA board (blade) is 280 mm deep and 322 mm high. The boards have a metal front panel and a metal cover on the bottom of the printed circuit board to limit electromagnetic interference and to limit the spread of fire. The locking injector-ejector handle (lever) actuates a microswitch to let the Intelligent Platform Management Controller (IPMC) know that an operator wants to remove a board, or that the board has just been installed, thus activating the hot-swap procedure. AdvancedTCA boards support the use of PCI Mezzanine Card (PMC) or Advanced Mezzanine Card (AMC) expansion mezzanines.

The shelf supports RTMs (Rear Transition Modules). RTMs plug into the back of the shelf in slot locations that match the front boards. The RTM and the front board are interconnected through a Zone-3 connector. The Zone-3 connector is not defined by the AdvancedTCA specification.

Each shelf slot is 30.48 mm wide. This allows for 14-board chassis to be installed in a 19-inch rack-mountable system and 16 boards in an ETSI rack-mountable system. A typical 14-slot system is 12 or 13 rack units high. The large AdvancedTCA shelves are targeted to the telecommunication market so the airflow goes in the front of the shelf, across the boards from bottom to top, and out the rear of the shelf. Smaller shelves that are used in enterprise applications typically have horizontal air flow.

The small-medium AdvancedTCA shelves are targeted to the telecommunication market; for the lab research operation, some shelves have an open cover in order to make testing easier.

== Backplane architecture ==
The AdvancedTCA backplane provides point-to-point connections between the boards and does not use a data bus. The backplane definition is divided into three sections; Zone-1, Zone-2, and Zone-3. The connectors in Zone-1 provide redundant −48 VDC power and Shelf Management signals to the boards. The connectors in Zone-2 provide the connections to the Base Interface and Fabric Interface. All Fabric connections use point-to-point 100 Ω differential signals. Zone-2 is called "Fabric Agnostic" which means that any Fabric that can use 100 Ω differential signals can be used with an AdvancedTCA backplane.

The connectors in Zone-3 are user defined and are usually used to connect a front board to a Rear Transition Module. The Zone-3 area can also hold a special backplane to interconnect boards with signals that are not defined in the AdvancedTCA specification.

The AdvancedTCA Fabric specification uses Logical Slots to describe the interconnections. The Fabric Switch Boards go in Logical Slots 1 and 2. The chassis manufacturer is free to decide the relationship between Logical and Physical Slots in a chassis. The chassis Field Replaceable Units (FRU) data includes an Address Table that describes the relationship between the Logical and Physical slots.

The Shelf Managers communicate with each board and FRU in the chassis with IPMI (Intelligent Platform Management Interface) protocols running on redundant I²C buses on the Zone-1 connectors.

The Base Interface is the primary Fabric on the Zone-2 connectors and allocates 4 differential pairs per Base Channel. It is wired as a Dual-Star with redundant fabric hub slots at the core. It is commonly used for out of band management, firmware uploading, OS boot, etc.

The Fabric Interface on the backplane supports many different Fabrics and can be wired as a Dual-Star, Dual-Dual-Star, Mesh, Replicated-Mesh or other architectures. It allocates 8 differential pairs per Fabric Channel and each Channel can be divided into four 2-pair Ports. The Fabric Interface is typically used to move data between the boards and the outside network.

The Synchronization Clock Interface routes MLVDS (Multipoint Low-voltage differential signaling) clock signals over multiple 130 Ω buses. The clocks are typically used to synchronize telecom interfaces.

Update Channel Interface is a set of 10 differential signal pairs that interconnect two slots. Which slots are interconnected depends on the particular backplane design. These are signals commonly used to interconnect two hub boards, or redundant processor boards.

== Fabrics ==
The Base Interface can only be 10BASE-T, 100BASE-TX, or 1000BASE-T Ethernet. Since all boards and hubs are required to support one of these interfaces there is always a network connection to the boards.

The Fabric is commonly SerDes Gigabit Ethernet, but can also be Fibre Channel, XAUI 10-Gigabit Ethernet, InfiniBand, PCI Express, or Serial RapidIO. Any Fabric that can use the point-to-point 100 Ω differential signals can be used with an AdvancedTCA backplane.

The PICMG 3.1 Ethernet/Fibre Channel specification has been revised to include IEEE 100GBASE-KR4 signaling to the existing IEEE 40GBASE-KR4, 10GBASE-KX4, 10GBASE-KR, and XAUI signaling.

== Blades (boards) ==
AdvancedTCA blades can be Processors, Switches, AMC carriers, etc. A typical shelf will contain one or more switch blades and several processor blades.

When they are first inserted into the shelf the onboard IPMC is powered from the redundant −48 V on the backplane. The IPMC sends an IPMI event message to the Shelf Manager to let it know that it has been installed. The Shelf Manager reads information from the blade and determines if there is enough power available. If there is, the Shelf Manager sends a command to the IPMC to power-up the payload part of the blade. The Shelf Manager also determines what fabric ports are supported by the blade. It then looks at the fabric interconnect information for the backplane to find out what fabric ports are on the other end of the fabric connections. If the fabric ports on both ends of the backplane wires match then it sends an IPMI command to both blades to enable the matching ports.

Once the blade is powered-up and connected to the fabrics the Shelf Manager listens for event messages from the sensors on the blade. If a temperature sensor reports that it is too warm then the Shelf Manager will increase the speed of the fans.

The FRU data in the board contains descriptive information like the manufacturer, model number, serial number, manufacturing date, revision, etc. This information can be read remotely to perform an inventory of the blades in a shelf.

== Shelf Management ==
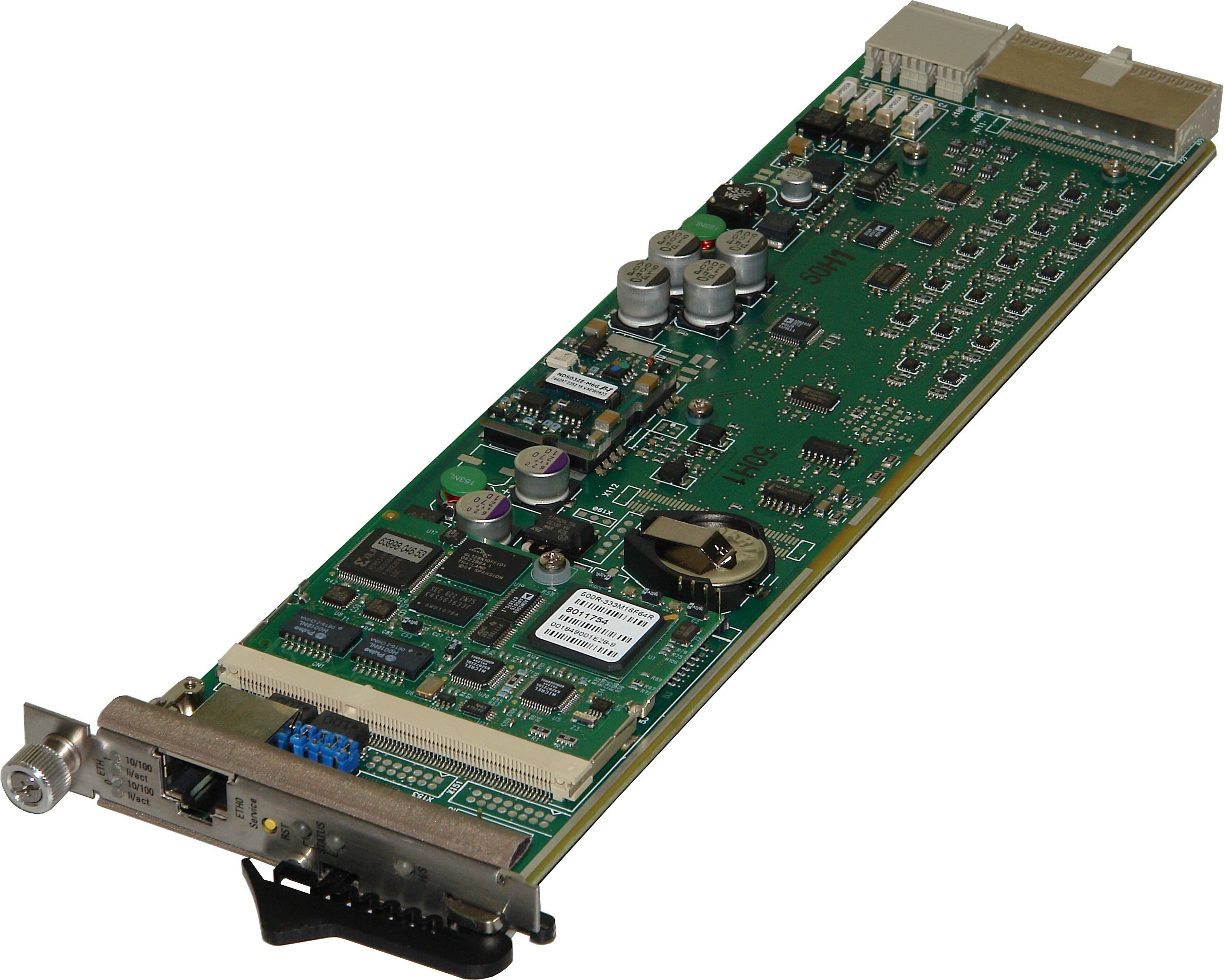
AdvancedTCA Shelf manager

The Shelf Manager monitors and controls the boards (blades) and FRU in the shelf. If any sensor reports a problem the Shelf Manager can take action or report the problem to a System Manager. This action could be something simple like making the fans go faster, or more drastic such as powering off a board. Each board and FRU contains inventory information (FRU Data) that can be retrieved by the Shelf Manager. The FRU data is used by the Shelf Manager to determine if there is enough power available for a board or FRU and if the Fabric ports that interconnect boards are compatible. The FRU data can also reveal the manufacturer, manufacturing date, model number, serial number, and asset tag.

Each blade, intelligent FRU, and Shelf Manager contains an Intelligent Platform Management Controller (IPMC). The Shelf Manager communicates with the boards and intelligent FRUs with IPMI protocols running on redundant I²C buses. IPMI protocols include packet checksums to ensure that data transmission is reliable. It is also possible to have non-intelligent FRUs managed by an intelligent FRUs. These are called Managed FRUs and have the same capabilities as an intelligent FRU.

The interconnection between the Shelf Manager and the boards is a redundant pair of Intelligent Platform Management Buses (IPMBs). The IPMB architecture can be a pair of buses (Bused IPMB) or a pair of radial connections (Radial IPMB). Radial IPMB implementations usually include the capability to isolate individual IPMB connections to improve reliability in the event of an IPMC failure.

The Shelf Manager communicates with outside entities with RMCP (IPMI over TCP/IP), HTTP, SNMP over an Ethernet network. Some Shelf Managers support the Hardware Platform Interface, a technical specification defined by the Service Availability Forum.

== New specification activity ==
Two new working groups have been started to adapt ATCA to the specific requirements of physics research.

- WG1: Physics xTCA I/O, Timing and Synchronization Working Group

WG1 will define rear I/O for AMC modules and a new component called the μRTM. Additions will be made to the μTCA Shelf specification to accommodate the μRTM and to the ATCA specification to accommodate AMC Rear I/O for an ATCA carrier RTM. Signal lines be identified for use as clocks, gates, and triggers that are commonly used in Physics data acquisition systems.

- WG2: Physics xTCA Software Architectures and Protocols Working Group

WG2 will define a common set of software architectures and supporting infrastructure to facilitate inter-operability and portability of both hardware and software modules among the various applications developed for the Physics xTCA platform and that will minimize the development effort and time required to construct experiments and systems using that platform.

A working group was formed to extend ATCA to non-telecom markets.

- PICMG 3.7 ATCA Extensions for Applications Outside the Telecom Central Office

The goals of this new working group are to define enhanced features to support double-wide boards; add enhancements to support 600W single-slot boards and 800W double-slot boards; add support for double-sided shelves with full sized boards plugged into both the front and rear of the shelf; and add support for 10Gbs signaling on the Base Interface.

== PICMG specifications ==
- 3.0 is the "base" or "core" specification. The AdvancedTCA definition alone defines a Fabric agnostic chassis backplane that can be used with any of the Fabrics defined in the following specifications:
- 3.1 Ethernet (and Fibre Channel)
- 3.2 InfiniBand
- 3.3 StarFabric
- 3.4 PCI Express (and PCI Express Advanced Switching)
- 3.5 RapidIO

== See also ==
- AdvancedMC - expansion cards for AdvancedTCA; also can be used standalone in MicroTCA systems.
- AXIe - A new modular instrumentation standard formally launched in November 2009, based on the ATCA standard.
- VPX
