= PCI Mezzanine Card =

Printed circuit board assembly manufactured to the IEEE P1386.1 standard

A PCI Mezzanine Card (PMC) is a printed circuit board assembly manufactured to the IEEE P1386.1 standard. This standard combines the electrical characteristics of the PCI bus with the mechanical dimensions of the Common Mezzanine Card or CMC format (IEEE 1386 standard).

A mezzanine connector connects two parallel printed circuit boards in a stacking configuration. Many mezzanine connector styles are commercially available for this purpose, however, PMC mezzanine applications usually use the 1.0 mm pitch 64-pin connector described in IEEE 1386.

A PMC can have up to four 64-pin bus connectors. The first two ("P1" and "P2") are used for 32-bit PCI signals, and a third ("P3") is needed for 64-bit PCI signals. An additional bus connector ("P4") can be used for non-specified I/O signals. In addition, arbitrary connectors can be supplied on the front panel of the chassis or case, also known as a "bezel."

The PMC standard defines which connector pins are used for which PCI signals; in addition, it defines the optional 64 "P4" connector pins for use of arbitrary I/O signals.

It enables manufacturers to offer products compatible with the well-established PCI bus, but in a smaller and more robust package than standard PCI plug-in cards. The word mezzanine, derived from the Italian mezzanino and also commonly used to refer to a platform inserted between two floors of a building, describes the way in which a PMC fits between two adjacent host cards in a standard card rack, attached to one of the cards by connectors and mounting pillars—a single PMC measures 74 mm x 149 mm. The standard also defines a double-sized card, but this is rarely used.

Carrier cards that accept PMCs are usually made in the Eurocard format, which includes single, double, and triple-height VMEbus cards, CompactPCI (cPCI) cards, and more recently, VPX cards. One PMC fits on a standard 3U carrier card while 6U models (typical for VMEbus cards) can carry up to two PMCs. PMCs were also used in early ATCA systems before the advent of the Advanced Mezzanine Card or AMC.

For the PMC standard, I/O technologies account for much of the market, but various card functions are commercially available, including Intel architecture and PowerPC processors, graphics cards, and memory cards. I/O cards are available such as serial communication controllers, SCSI controllers, graphics controllers and FireWire controllers.

The original Apple iMac G3 motherboard had a slot for a mezzanine card. It was undocumented and was removed in a later iMac hardware revision, but a few cards were released for it, including a graphics accelerator and a SCSI interface.

== Variants ==
Additional standards exist that define variants of the standard PMC. For example,

- PMC-X (PCI-X PMC) defined by the VITA 39 standard
- PPMC (aka PrPMC; processor PMC) is defined by the VITA 32 standard. I.e. for allowing processors to have host or monarch support on a PMC. Additional signaling is defined so that the PrPMC can work as the host processor on a PCI bus. The intention is to allow a monarch PMC to control the PCI bus. This is usually a requirement if the PMC is to act as a host processor module.
- CCPMC (conduction-cooled PMC) defined by the VITA 20 standard
- XMC, or Switched Mezzanine Card (PMC with high-speed serial fabric interconnect) defined by the VITA 42 standard. XMC specifies a fifth connector ("P15") that supports PCI Express (VITA 42.3) or other high-speed serial formats such as Serial RapidIO (VITA 42.2) and Parallel RapidIO (VITA 42.1).
- FMC – FPGA Mezzanine Card provides a standard mezzanine form factor that offers a flexible, modular I/O interface to an FPGA located on a host system baseboard or carrier card.
- OAI-OAM (Open Accelerator Infrastructure - Accelerator Module) standard from Open Compute Project, describes AI accelerator cards for blade servers, up to 8 cards on a universal base board, each with 7 PCIe x16 links, 12 V or 48 to 60 V power line, up to 600 W TBP (total board power) with air cooling, 600+ W with liquid cooling, interchangeable heatsinks and coldplates.
