= Data acquisition =

Process of sampling signals from sensors and converting into digital data

Data acquisition is the process of sampling signals that measure real-world physical conditions and converting the resulting samples into digital numeric values that can be manipulated by a computer. Data acquisition systems, abbreviated by the acronyms DAS, DAQ, or DAU, typically convert analog waveforms into digital values for processing. The components of data acquisition systems include:

- Sensors, to convert physical parameters to electrical signals.
- Signal conditioning circuitry, to convert sensor signals into a form that can be converted to digital values.
- Analog-to-digital converters, to convert conditioned sensor signals to digital values.

Digital data acquisition system block diagram

Data acquisition applications are usually controlled by software programs developed using various general purpose programming languages such as Assembly, BASIC, C, C++, C#, Fortran, Java, LabVIEW, Lisp, Pascal, etc. Stand-alone data acquisition systems are often called data loggers.

There are also open-source software packages providing all the necessary tools to acquire data from different, typically specific, hardware equipment. These tools come from the scientific community where complex experiment requires fast, flexible, and adaptable software. Those packages are usually custom-fit but more general DAQ packages like the Maximum Integrated Data Acquisition System can be easily tailored and are used in several physics experiments.

== History ==
In 1963, IBM produced computers that specialized in data acquisition. These include the IBM 7700 Data Acquisition System, and its successor, the IBM 1800 Data Acquisition and Control System. These expensive specialized systems were surpassed in 1974 by general-purpose S-100 computers and data acquisition cards produced by Tecmar/Scientific Solutions Inc. In 1981 IBM introduced the IBM Personal Computer and Scientific Solutions introduced the first PC data acquisition products.

== Methodology ==
=== Sources and systems ===
Data acquisition begins with the physical phenomenon or physical property to be measured. Examples of this include temperature, vibration, light intensity, gas pressure, fluid flow, and force. Regardless of the type of physical property to be measured, the physical state that is to be measured must first be transformed into a unified form that can be sampled by a data acquisition system. The task of performing such transformations falls on devices called sensors. A data acquisition system is a collection of software and hardware that allows one to measure or control the physical characteristics of something in the real world. A complete data acquisition system consists of DAQ hardware, sensors and actuators, signal conditioning hardware, and a computer running DAQ software. If timing is necessary (such as for event mode DAQ systems), a separate compensated distributed timing system is required.

A sensor, which is a type of transducer, is a device that converts a physical property into a corresponding electrical signal (e.g., strain gauge, thermistor). An acquisition system to measure different properties depends on the sensors that are suited to detect those properties. Signal conditioning may be necessary if the signal from the transducer is not suitable for the DAQ hardware being used. The signal may need to be filtered, shaped, or amplified in most cases. Various other examples of signal conditioning might be bridge completion, providing current or voltage excitation to the sensor, isolation, and linearization. For transmission purposes, single ended analog signals, which are more susceptible to noise can be converted to differential signals. Once digitized, the signal can be encoded to reduce and correct transmission errors.

=== DAQ hardware ===
DAQ hardware is what usually interfaces between the signal and a PC. It could be in the form of modules that can be connected to the computer's ports (parallel, serial, USB, etc.) or cards connected to slots (S-100 bus, AppleBus, ISA, MCA, PCI, PCI-E, etc.) in a PC motherboard or in a modular crate (CAMAC, NIM, VME). Sometimes adapters are needed, in which case an external breakout box can be used.

DAQ cards often contain multiple components (multiplexer, ADC, DAC, TTL-IO, high-speed timers, RAM). These are accessible via a bus by a microcontroller, which can run small programs. A controller is more flexible than a hard-wired logic, yet cheaper than a CPU so it is permissible to block it with simple polling loops. For example: Waiting for a trigger, starting the ADC, looking up the time, waiting for the ADC to finish, move value to RAM, switch multiplexer, get TTL input, let DAC proceed with voltage ramp.

Today, signals from some sensors and Data Acquisition Systems can be streamed via Bluetooth.

=== DAQ device drivers ===
DAQ device drivers are needed for the DAQ hardware to work with a PC. The device driver performs low-level register writes and reads on the hardware while exposing API for developing user applications in a variety of programs.

=== Input devices ===
- 3D scanner
- Analog-to-digital converter
- Time-to-digital converter

=== Hardware ===
- Computer Automated Measurement and Control (CAMAC)
- Industrial Ethernet
- Industrial USB
- LAN eXtensions for Instrumentation
- Network interface controller
- PCI eXtensions for Instrumentation
- VMEbus
- VXI

=== DAQ software ===
Specialized DAQ software may be delivered with the DAQ hardware. Software tools used for building large-scale data acquisition systems include EPICS. Other programming environments that are used to build DAQ applications include ladder logic, Visual C++, Visual Basic, LabVIEW, and MATLAB.

== See also ==
- Black box
- Data collection (synonym)
- Data logger
- Data storage device
- Data science
- Sensor
- Signal processing
- Transducer
