= VXS =

VMEbus performance improvement standard

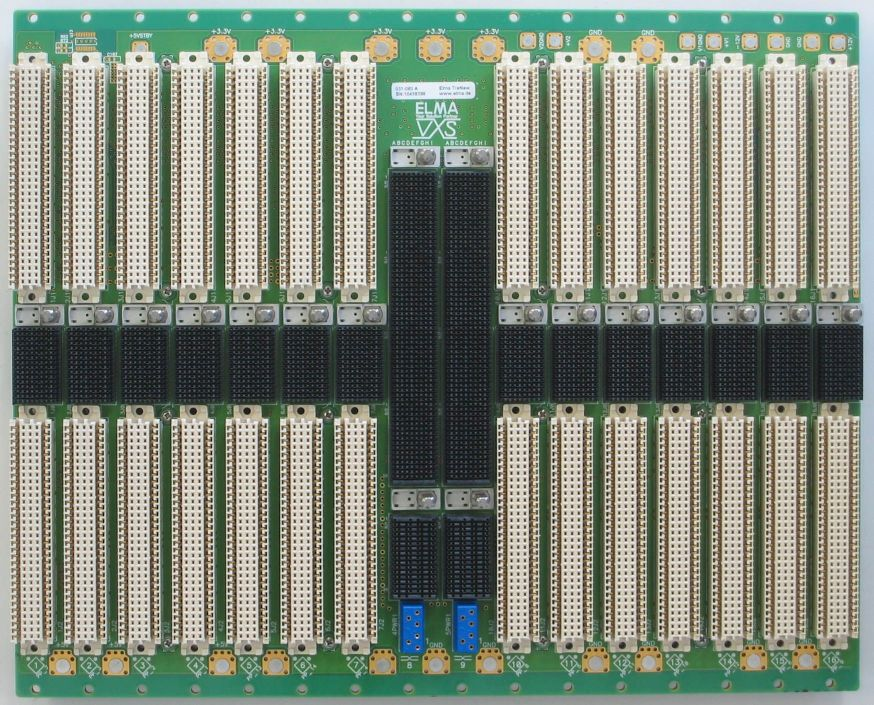
Backplane with VXS connectors (black)

VMEBus Switched Serial, commonly known as VXS, is an ANSI standard (ANSI/VITA 41) that improves the performance of standard parallel VMEbus by enhancing it to support newer switched serial fabrics. The base specification (ANSI 41) defines all common elements of the standard, while "dot"-specifications (ANSI 41.n) define extensions which use specific serial fabrics (such as PCI Express, RapidIO, StarFabric from Dolphin Interconnect Solutions and InfiniBand) or additional functionality. VXS is backward compatible with VMEBus. It is defined by the VME International Trade Association (VITA) working group.

== Specification ==
In common with other similar standards, VXS comprises a ‘base line’ specification, which defines the basic mechanical and electrical elements of VXS, together with a series of ‘dot level’ specifications, one or more of which must be implemented to create a functional module. The specifications are as follows:

| | Basic module |
|---|---|
| VITA 41.0 | VXS Base Standard - ANSI ratified |
| VITA 41.1 | InfiniBand Protocol on VXS |
| VITA 41.2 | Serial RapidIO Protocol on VXS |
| VITA 41.3 | VXS Ethernet 1000 Mbit/s Baseband IEEE 802.3 Protocol Layer Standard |
| VITA 41.4 | VXS 4X PCI Express Protocol Layer Standard |
| VITA 41.10 | Live Insertion System Requirements for VITA 41 Boards |
| VITA 41.11 | VXS Rear Transition Module Standard |

== See also ==
- VPX
