= PICMG 2.14 =

Technical specification for packet-based communication

PICMG 2.14 is a specification by PICMG (PCI Industrial Computer Manufacturers Group) that defines a packet-based communications between heterogeneous PCI (Peripheral Component Interconnect) agents (multi-computing) within the CompactPCI (3U or 6U Eurocard-based industrial computer) system architecture.

== Status ==
- Adopted: 9/5/2001
- Current Revision: 1.0
