= PICMG 1.2 =

PICMG 1.2 is a specification by PICMG that standardizes both mechanical and electrical interfaces to support a standard form factor PCI computer system. PICMG 1.2 defines a single board computer in a passive backplane architecture with either two PCI/PCI-X busses or a single PCI/PCI-X bus. It is similar to PICMG 1.0 but removes the ISA bus.

== Status ==
Adopted : 1/23/2002

Current Revision : 1.0
