= P112 (disambiguation) =

The P112 is a single-board computer.

P112 may also refer to:

- ARM Francisco Zarco (P112), a patrol boat of the Mexican Navy
- Papyrus 112, a biblical manuscript
- TCG Demirhisar (P-112), a patrol boat of the Turkish Navy
- P112, a state regional road in Latvia
