= PICMG 2.9 =

PICMG 2.9 is a specification by PICMG that defines an implementation of a system management bus in a CompactPCI system. This system management bus uses an I2C hardware layer, and is based on the Intelligent Platform Management Interface (IPMI) and Intelligent Platform Management Bus (IPMB) specifications.

== Status ==
Adopted : 2/2/2000

Current Revision : 1.0

ECN001 (Engineering Change Number) was adopted 5/20/2002
