= PICMG 1.3 =

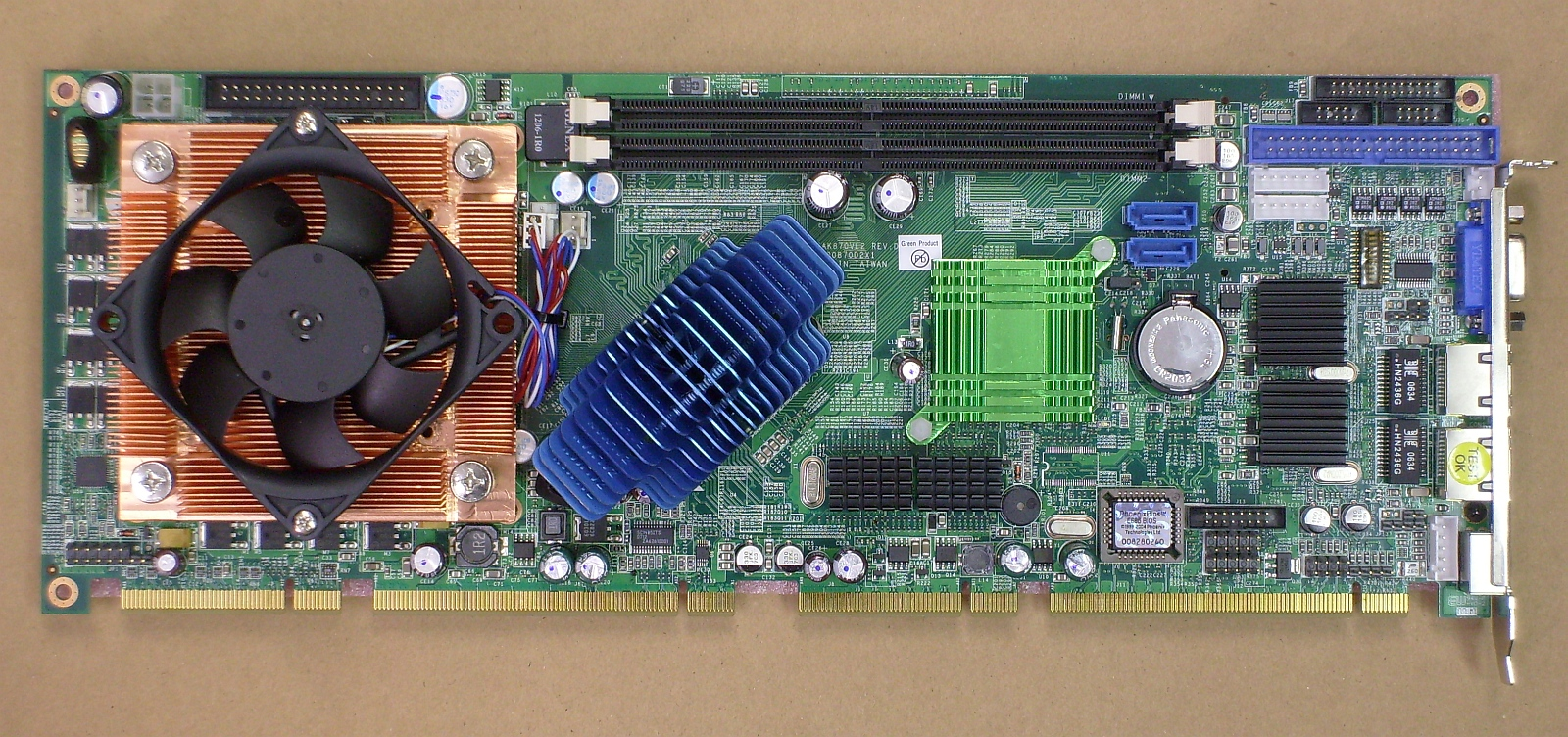
Socket 775 Slot-CPU (PICMG 1.3)

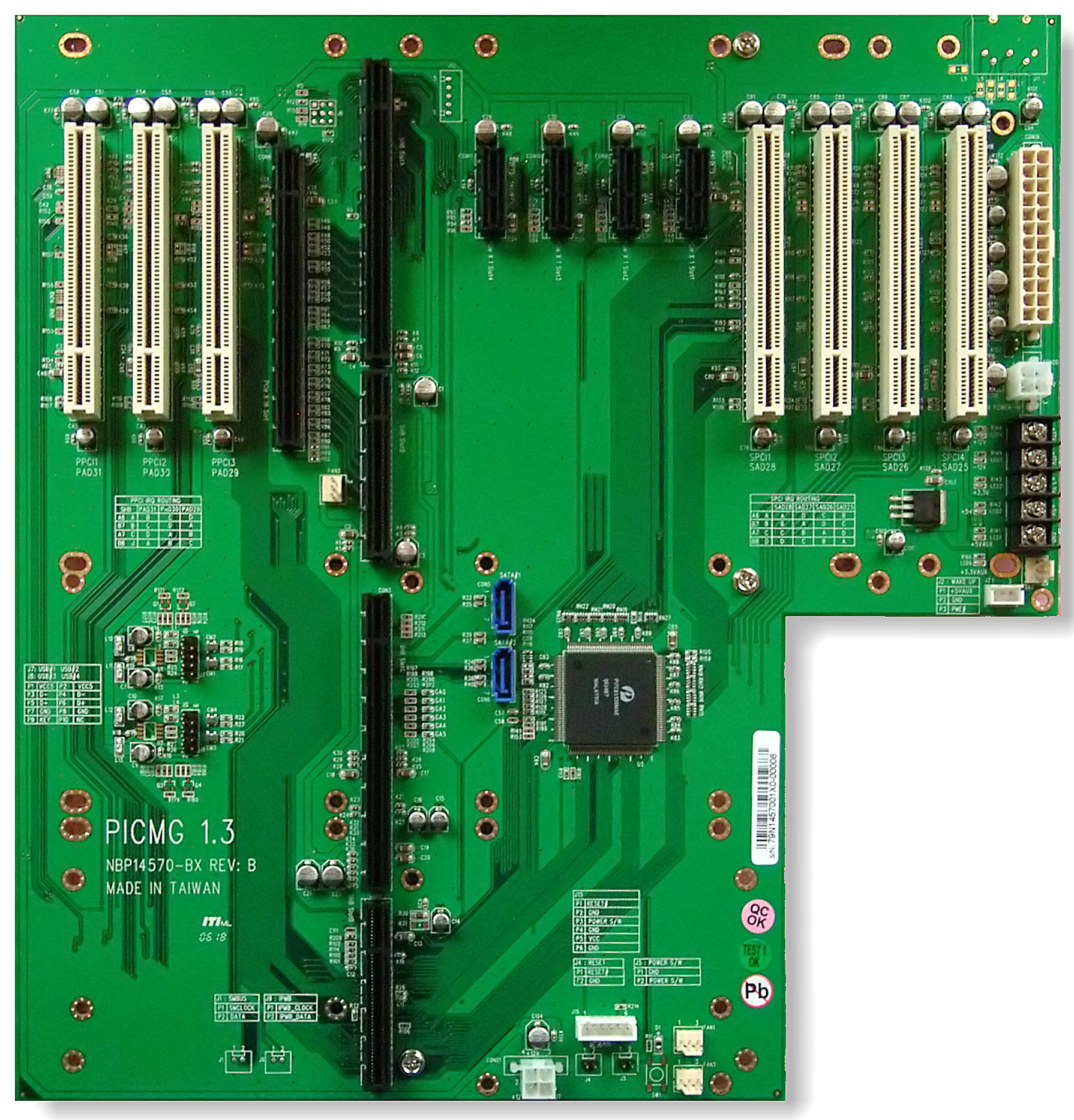
PICMG 1.3 backplane

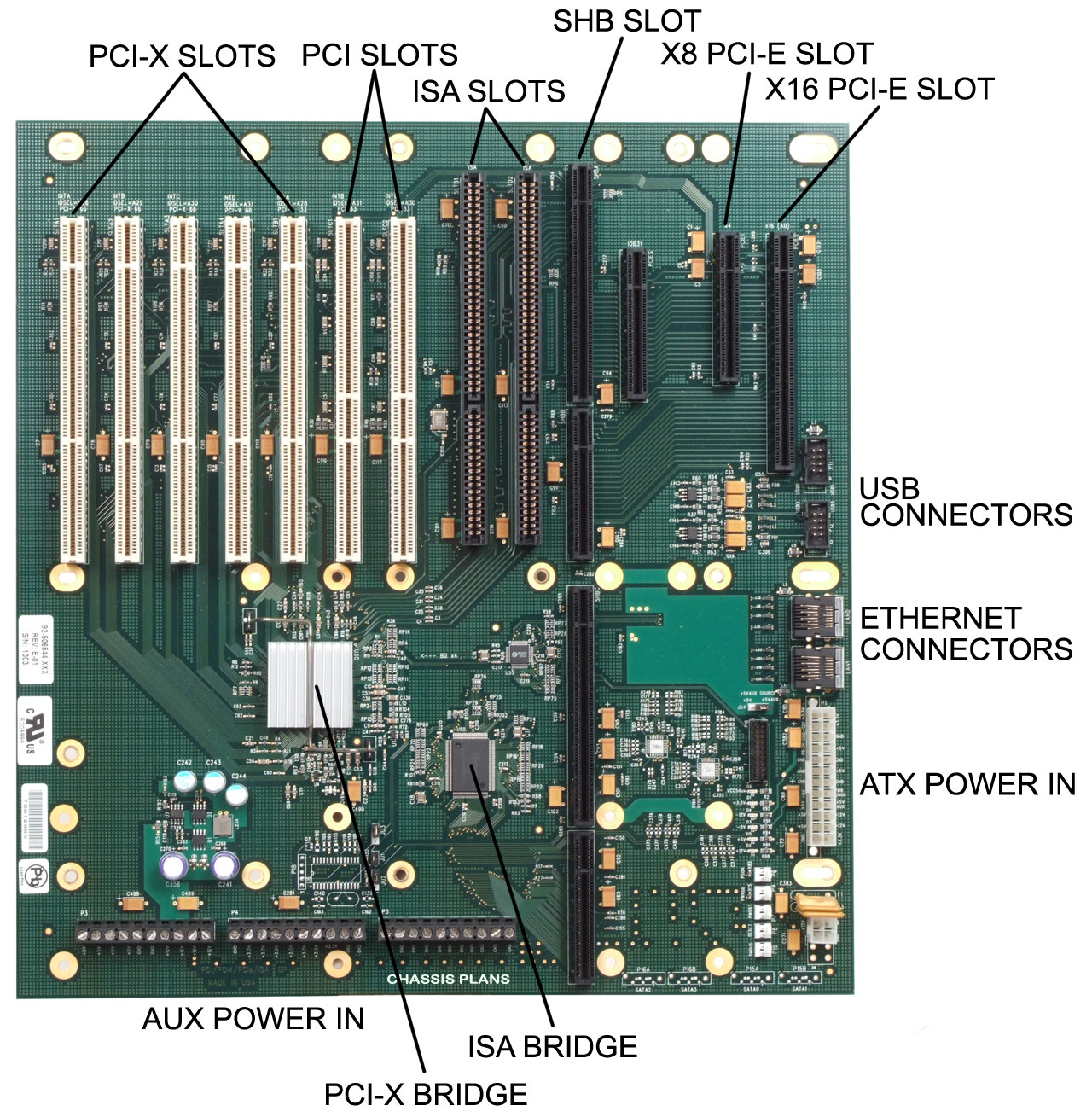
Major components on a PICMG 1.3 active backplane)

PICMG 1.3 is a PICMG specification which is commonly referred to as SHB Express. SHB Express is a modernization of PICMG 1.0 single-board computer specification. SHB Express, or System Host Board – Express, uses the same physical form factor as PICMG 1.0 boards. The board-to-backplane interfaces are PCI Express instead of PCI and ISA, although the use of PCI remains as an option.

== Key Features ==
- PCI Express: 20 PCI Express lanes including x16, x8, x4 and x1 PCI Express configuration are supported.
- PCI optional supported: 32Bit PCI Bus with up to 4 Master-capable Slots at the Backplane and with 33 MHz or optional 66 MHz. PCI-X Capabilities are also optional supported.
- additional I/O: up to 4 USB Connections, up to 2 SATA and up to 2 Ethernet (GBit) are also optional supported to the Backplane.

== PICMG Status ==
Adopted : 8/20/2005

Current Revision : 1.0
