= PICMG 2.11 =

PICMG 2.11 is a specification by PICMG that defines the electrical and mechanical requirements relating to plug-in power modules in CompactPCI systems.

== Status ==
Adopted : 10/1/1999

Current Revision : 1.0
