= PICMG 1.1 =

PICMG 1.1 is a PICMG specification that defines how PCI to PCI bridging is accomplished in PICMG 1.0 systems.

== PICMG Status ==
Adopted : 5/25/1995

Current Revision : 1.1
