= PICMG 2.2 =

Pin assignment standard

PICMG 2.2 is a specification by PICMG that standardizes pin assignments for PICMG 2.0 CompactPCI to include VME64 Extensions.

== Status ==
Adopted : 9/9/1998

Current Revision : 1.0
