= PICMG 2.3 =

Technical specification for connectors

PICMG 2.3 is a specification by PICMG that standardizes user IO pin mappings from IEEE 1386 PMC sites to CompactPCI's J3/P3, J4/P4, and J5/P5 connections on a CompactPCI backplane

== Status ==
Adopted : 9/9/1998

Current Revision : 1.0
