= Europe Card Bus =

Computer bus developed in 1977

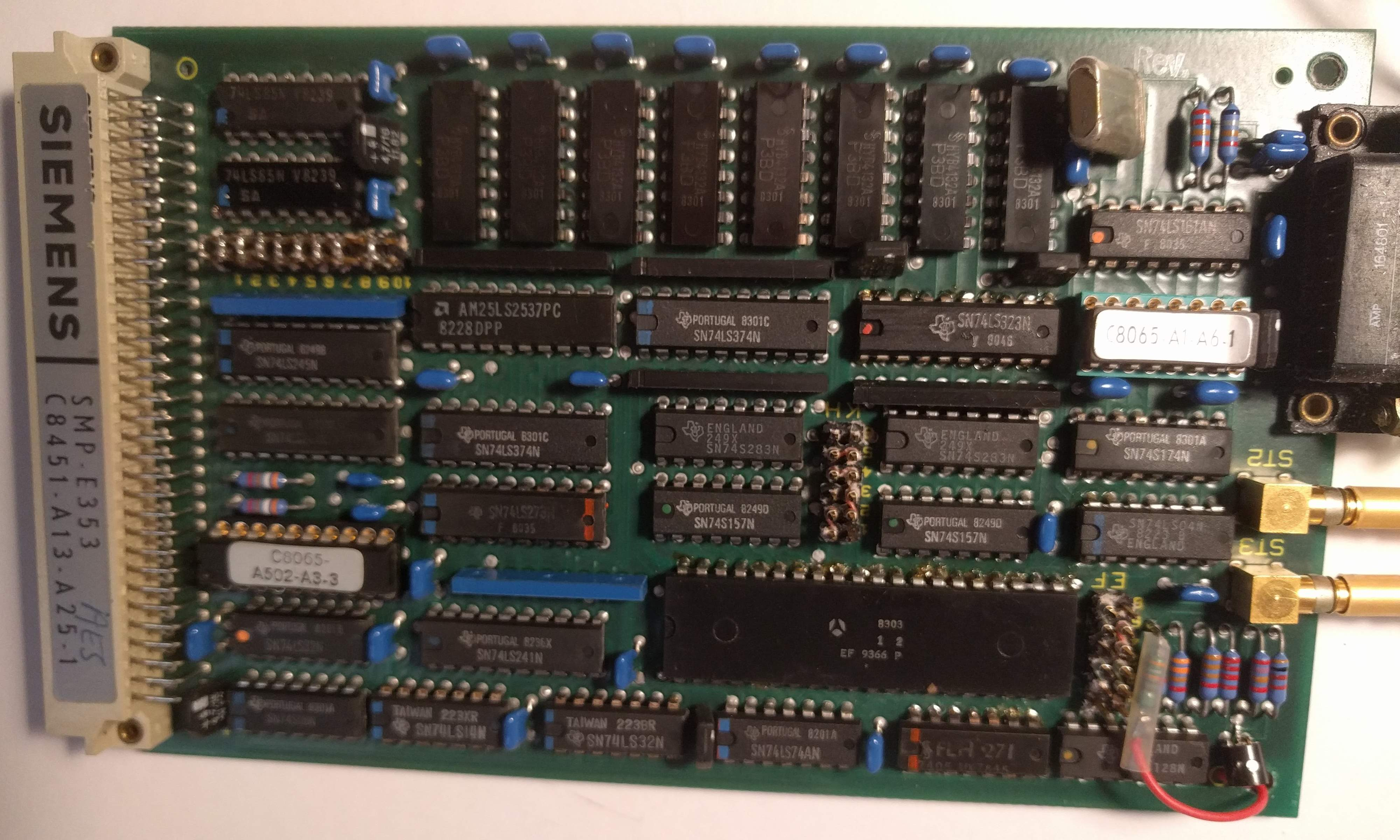
ECB video board

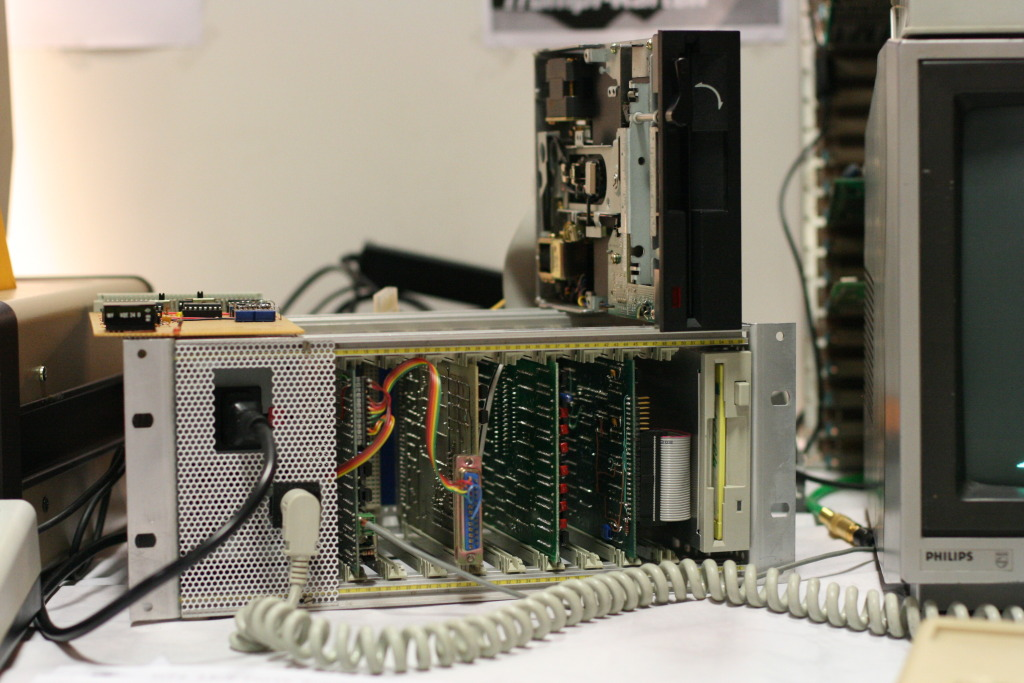
ECB computer

The Europe Card Bus (ECB or ECB-bus) is a computer bus developed in 1977 by the company Kontron, mainly for the 8-bit Zilog Z80, Intel 8080 and Intel 8085 microprocessor families.

== Physical format ==
Mechanically, the ECB is usually implemented as a backplane circuit board installed in a 19-inch rack chassis. ECB cards have 3U Eurocard format (100 mm × 160 mm).

== Connector ==
Use two or three-row versions of DIN 41612 connectors, 0.1" pitch. Original Kontron ECB, supported 64 pins, using "a" and "c" rows, ”b” row tied to "C' row. ECB boards are NOT compatible with STEbus or VMEbus P2 connector (while STEbus does not use the “b” column; VME does define specific signals on the ‘b’ row).

== Pinout ==
ECB-bus pinout seen looking into backplane socket
num.	name	a b c	name
1	+5 V	o + o	+5 V
2	D5	o + o	D0
3	D6	o + o	D7
4	D3	o + o	D2
5	D4	o + o	A0
6	A2	o + o	A3
7	A4	o + o	A1
8	A5	o + o	A8
9	A6	o + o	A7
10	WAIT/	o + o	D8
11	BUSRQ/	o + o	IEI
12	BAI 1	o + o	D9
13	+12 V	o + o	D10
14	D11	o + o	D1
15	−5 V	o + o	−15 V
16	2PHI	o + o	IEO
17	BA0 1	o + o	A11
18	A14	o + o	A10
19	+15 V	o + o	D13
20	M1/	o + o	/NMI
21	D14	o + o	INT/
22	D15	o + o	WR/
23	/DPR	o + o	D12
24	+5 V Bat	o + o	RD/
25	nPHI	o + o	HALT/
26	WRITE EN	o + o	/PWRRCL
27	IORQ/	o + o	A12
28	RFSH/	o + o	A15
29	A13	o + o	PHI
30	A9	o + o	MREQ/
31	BUSAK/	o + o	RESET/
32	GND	o + o	GND

Active low signals indicated by slash.

GND: Ground reference voltage

+5 V: Powers most logic.

+12 V; −12 V: +15 V; −15 V Legacy power inputs, primarily useful for RS232 buffer power or ADU. The +12 V used for programming voltage generators. Both can be used in analogue circuitry, but note that these are primarily power rails for digital circuitry, so decoupling or local regulation is recommended for analogue circuitry.

+5 V Bat: Standby voltage. Optional. This line is reserved for carrying a battery backup voltage to boards that supply or consume it. NiCad batteries are common source. The ECBbus spec is not rigid about where this should be sourced from. In practice, this means that most boards requiring backup power tend to play safe and have a battery on board, often with a link to allow it to supply or accept power from +5 V Bat. You can end up with more batteries in your system than you need, so care must be taken that no more than one battery is driving the +5 V Bat line.

D0...7: Data bus. This is only 8 bits wide, but most I/O or memory-mapped peripherals are byte-oriented.

A0...19: Address bus. This allows up to 1 MB of memory to be addressed. Current technology is such that processor requiring large amounts of memory has this on the processor board, so this is not a great limitation. I/O space is limited to 4K, to simplify I/O address decoding to a practical level. A 74LS688 can decode A11...4 to locate I/O slave boards at 16-byte boundaries.

BUSRQ/ and BUSAK/: Bus Requests and Bus Acknowledge. Optional, used by multi-master systems. The number of Attention Requests reflects that the ECB-bus aims to be simple. Single-master systems are the norm, but these signals allow systems to have secondary bus masters if needed.

HALT/: CPU Stopped.

BAI 1; BAO 1: Bus Priority In; Bus Priority Out.

IEI; IEO: Interrupt Enable In; Interrupt Enable Out.

IORQ/: In / Out Request

MREQ/: Memory Request

PHI; nPHI: System Clock; nx Clock.

RESET/: System Reset.

== Technical notes ==
- Signal inputs must be Schmitt trigger.
- Signal outputs must have a fan-out of 20
- Backplane can have up to ??[data missing] sockets
- Active bus-termination recommended

== Notable uses ==
The DIN 41612 connector has different pin assignments assigned by various manufacturers, such as Kontron, J&K, ELZET80, Conitec, etc.

N8VEM homebrew computing project uses ECB and provides a large number of various ECB cards and a couple of ECB backplanes along with Z80 processor socket shim adapters to allow a great number of retro-computers access to the ECB bus without the need for major system modification. The Retrobrew Computer Group has expanded the definition of ECB Pinouts as well as I/O Port usage guidelines.
