= CompactPCI Serial =

CompactPCI Serial is an industrial standard for modular computer systems. It is based on the established PICMG 2.0 CompactPCI standard, which uses the parallel PCI bus for communication among a system's card components. In contrast to this, CompactPCI Serial uses only serial point-to-point connections. CompactPCI Serial was officially adopted by the PCI Industrial Computer Manufacturers Group PICMG as PICMG CPCI-S.0 CompactPCI Serial in March 2011. Its mechanical concept is based on the proven standards of IEEE 1101-1-1998 and IEEE 1101-10-1996 (19" technology). CompactPCI Serial includes different connectors that permit very high data rates. The new technology standard succeeding parallel CompactPCI comprises another specification called PICMG 2.30 CompactPCI PlusIO. This is why CompactPCI Serial and CompactPCI PlusIO as a whole were also called CompactPCI Plus. PICMG's first working title of CompactPCI Serial was CPLUS.0. (See also #Compatibility and Migration.) CompactPCI Serial backplanes and chassis are developed by Schroff, Elma, and Pixus Technologies companies, as for the CompactPCI Serial board level electronics – they are developed by MEN Mikro Elektronik, Fastwel, EKF, Emerson Embedded Computing, ADLINK, and Kontron.

== History ==
Fast serial point-to-point connections have become the state-of-the-art technology and are gradually replacing the classic bus architecture in computers. The CompactPCI standard as it is now does not offer a standardized solution for the kind of modular, serial connectivity requested for the future. This is why CompactPCI Serial was defined as the new future standard. It introduces a serial topology while keeping the proven basic concepts of CompactPCI.

== Star Topology ==
Thanks to modern chipset architecture, the structure of computers is slowly changing from bus-based interconnections between interface controllers to a star topology built up of serial point-to-point connections. CompactPCI Serial incorporates this star architecture: one system slot can control up to eight peripheral slots. Two of these connections can be PCI Express x8 fat pipes. At the same time, CompactPCI Serial does not need bridges, switched fabrics, or special backplanes. The star connection by standard includes PCI Express, SATA/SAS, and USB.

== Ethernet Full Mesh Architecture ==
CompactPCI Serial can connect a total of nine cards in a system (one system slot, eight peripheral) through a full Ethernet mesh that supports the IEEE 802.3 Ethernet standard. In this way the new specification is optimized for symmetrical multiprocessing and redundant system topologies.

== Interfaces ==
The PICMG CPCI-S.0 system slot supports the following interfaces at the backplane connectors:

- 8 x PCI Express
  - 6 x4 links
  - 2 x8 links (fat pipes)
  - 2 dedicated I²C high-speed buses for the fat pipes
  - Optional serial RapidIO
- 8 x SATA/SAS
  - Supported by SGPIO bus (SFF-8485 specification) for hot swapping
- 8 x USB 2.0
- 8 x USB 3.0
- 8 x Ethernet 10GBASE-T
- Optional hot swap support by one dedicated I²C bus
- Optional IPMI support by one dedicated I²C bus

The PICMG CPCI-S.0 peripheral slot supports the following interfaces at the backplane connectors:

- 1 x PCI Express
  - Up to 8 lanes per link
- 1 x SATA
  - Supported by a dedicated SGPIO bus (SFF-8485 specification)
- 1 x USB 2.0
- 1 x USB 3.0
- Up to 8 Ethernet 10GBASE-T interfaces
- Geographical addressing

== Power Supply of CompactPCI Serial ==
PICMG CPCI-S.0 defines a single 12-V power supply both for system slots and peripheral slots.

== Backplane Connectors of CompactPCI Serial ==
The PICMG subcommittee drafting the standard has proposed a new, denser backplane connector type with a 2 mm x 1.4 mm pitch that supports higher transfer rates of up to 12 Gbit/s without a need for bridges or switches. It offers up to 184 pin pairs on a 3U board. A major difference compared to CompactPCI is that with CompactPCI Serial the plug connector is on the board, while the receptacle is on the backplane. This approach is intended to make the standard more robust by avoiding twisted pins on the backplane: If a pin fails, only the plug-in board must be exchanged. The system slot of CompactPCI Serial has six connectors: P1 to P6. On peripheral boards only P1 is mandatory, while P2 to P6 are optional.

== Rear I/O Concept ==
A peripheral CompactPCI Serial slot only has a small connector with 6 rows of contacts for power and signals. The remainder of a 3U single Eurocard is free for user-defined I/O and offers a total of 128 differential contact pairs or 384 contacts. This is significantly more than in 32-bit CompactPCI. 6U double Eurocards provide the entire upper section of the board for user-defined I/O, as do PICMG 2.0 CompactPCI boards of this size. An advantage of the new architecture is that front and rear I/O boards are inserted directly into one another. By contrast to CompactPCI, no midplane or transfer connector is needed here, which reduces costs and increases system flexibility.

== Compatibility and Migration ==
The mechanical specification of PICMG CPCI-S.0 CompactPCI Serial is 100% compliant with PICMG 2.0 CompactPCI except for its new backplane connectors. Since the two standards have a different topology, there is no direct "bus compatibility". For this reason, PICMG has also created an extension to CompactPCI: PICMG 2.30 CompactPCI PlusIO. This standard is intended as a migration path from CompactPCI to CompactPCI Serial. It is 100% compatible with CompactPCI but includes a fixed definition of fast serial I/O interfaces at its backplane J2 connector. Also, it has a new J2 connector that is compatible but supports higher data rates compared to CompactPCI. Hybrid backplanes support several cards of the three different standards PICMG 2.0, 2.30, and CPCI-S.0.

== CompactPCI Serial Space ==
In August 2017, PICMG ratified the CompactPCI Serial Space specification CPCI-S.1 R1.0, which provides a highly ruggedized implementation of CompactPCI Serial. It is used in satellites as the payload controller as well as ground-based control systems.

== See also ==
- CompactPCI
- CompactPCI PlusIO
- PICMG
- VPX
