= STEbus =

Non-proprietary, processor-independent, computer bus

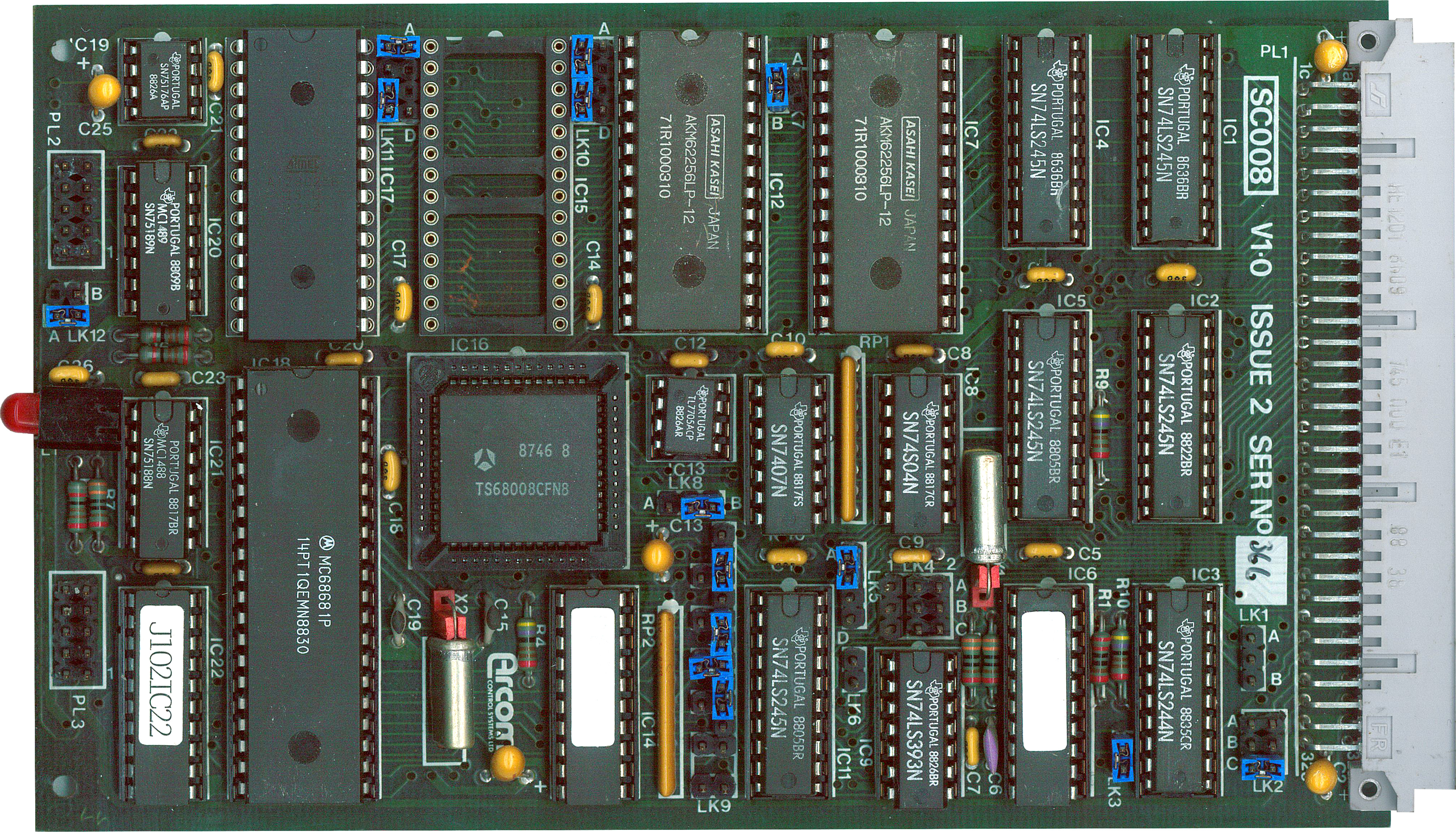
STEbus 68008 processor

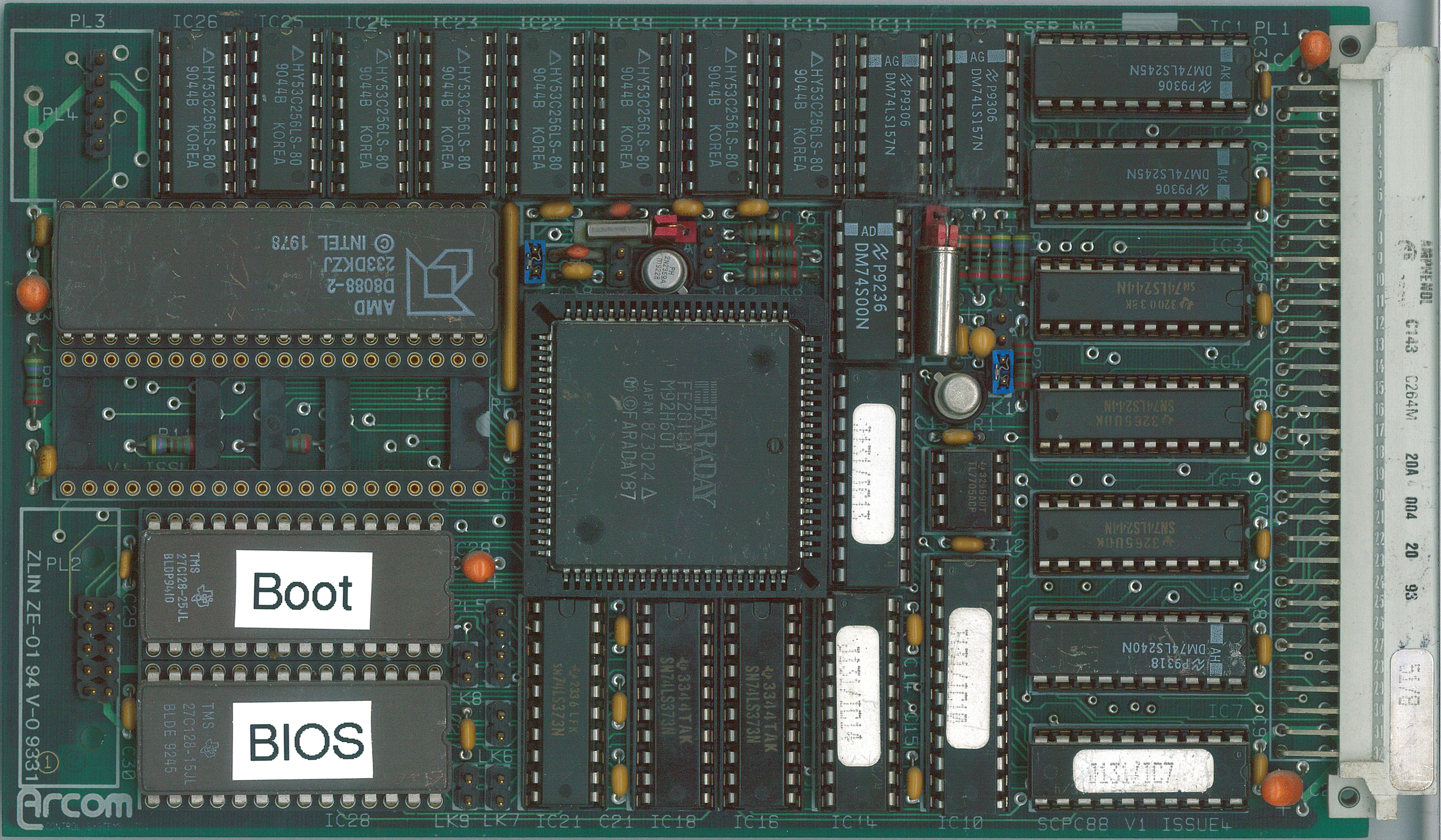
STEbus 8088 processor

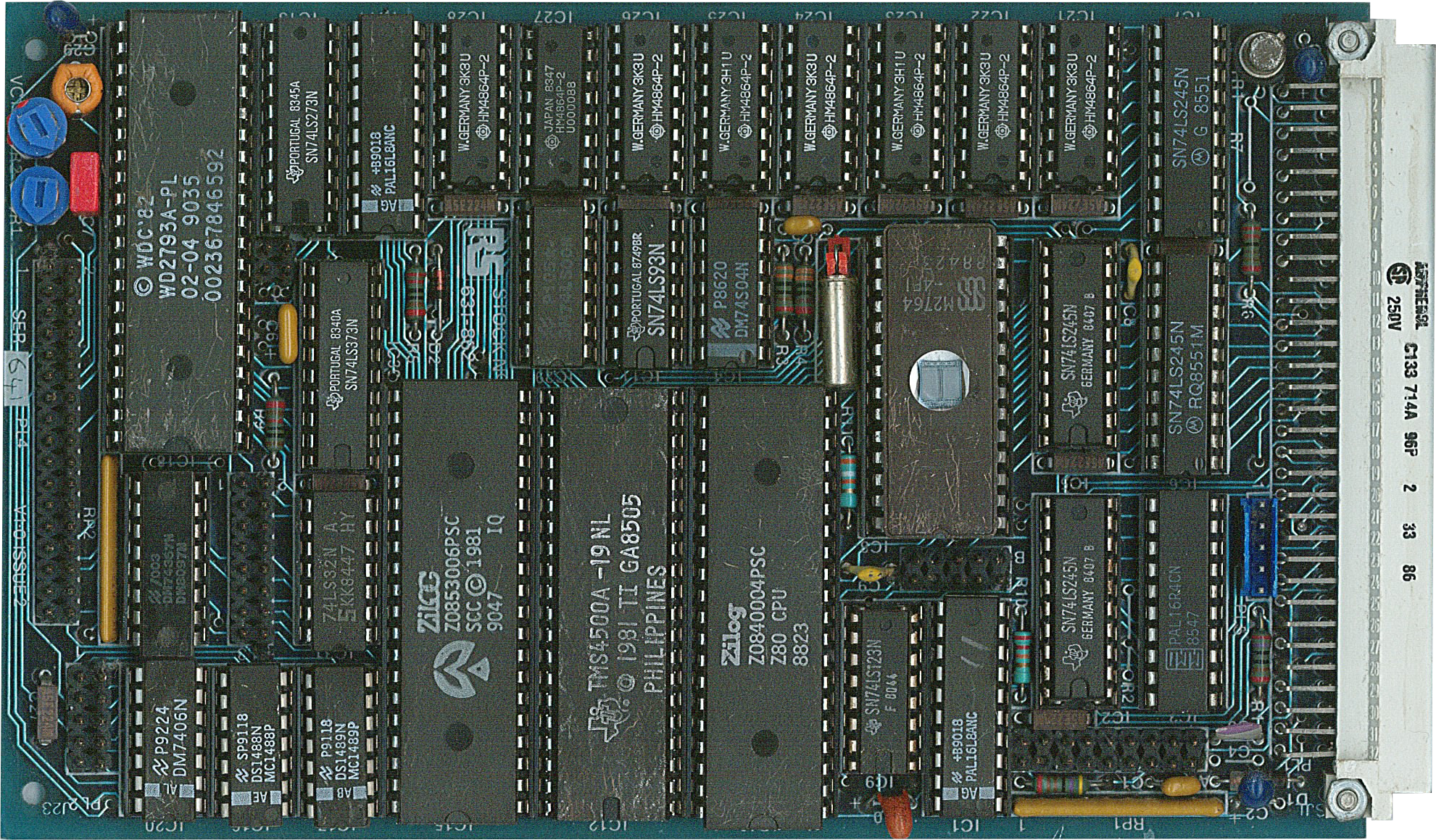
STEbus Z80 processor and FDC

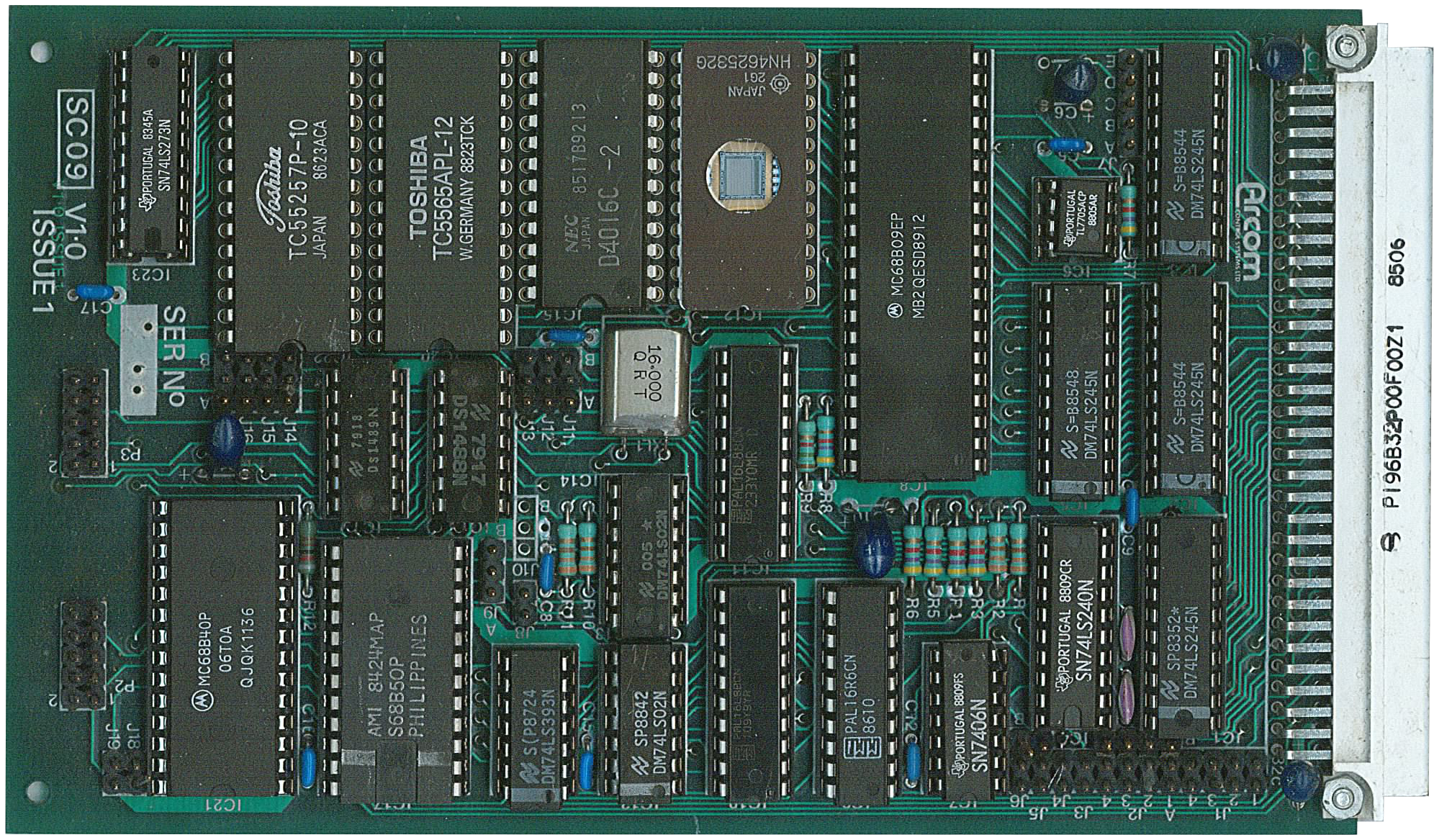
STEbus 68B09E processor

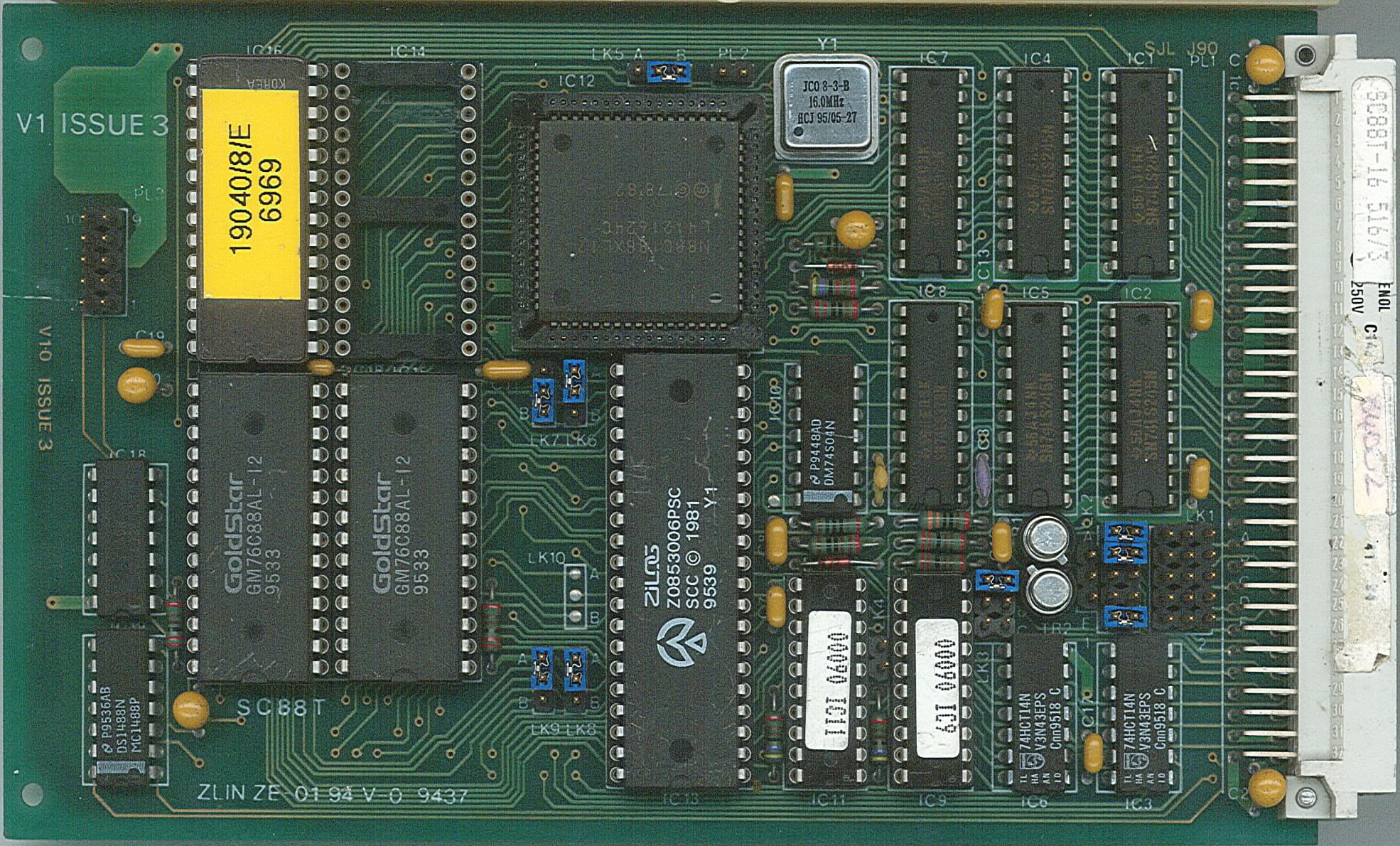
STEbus 80C188 processor

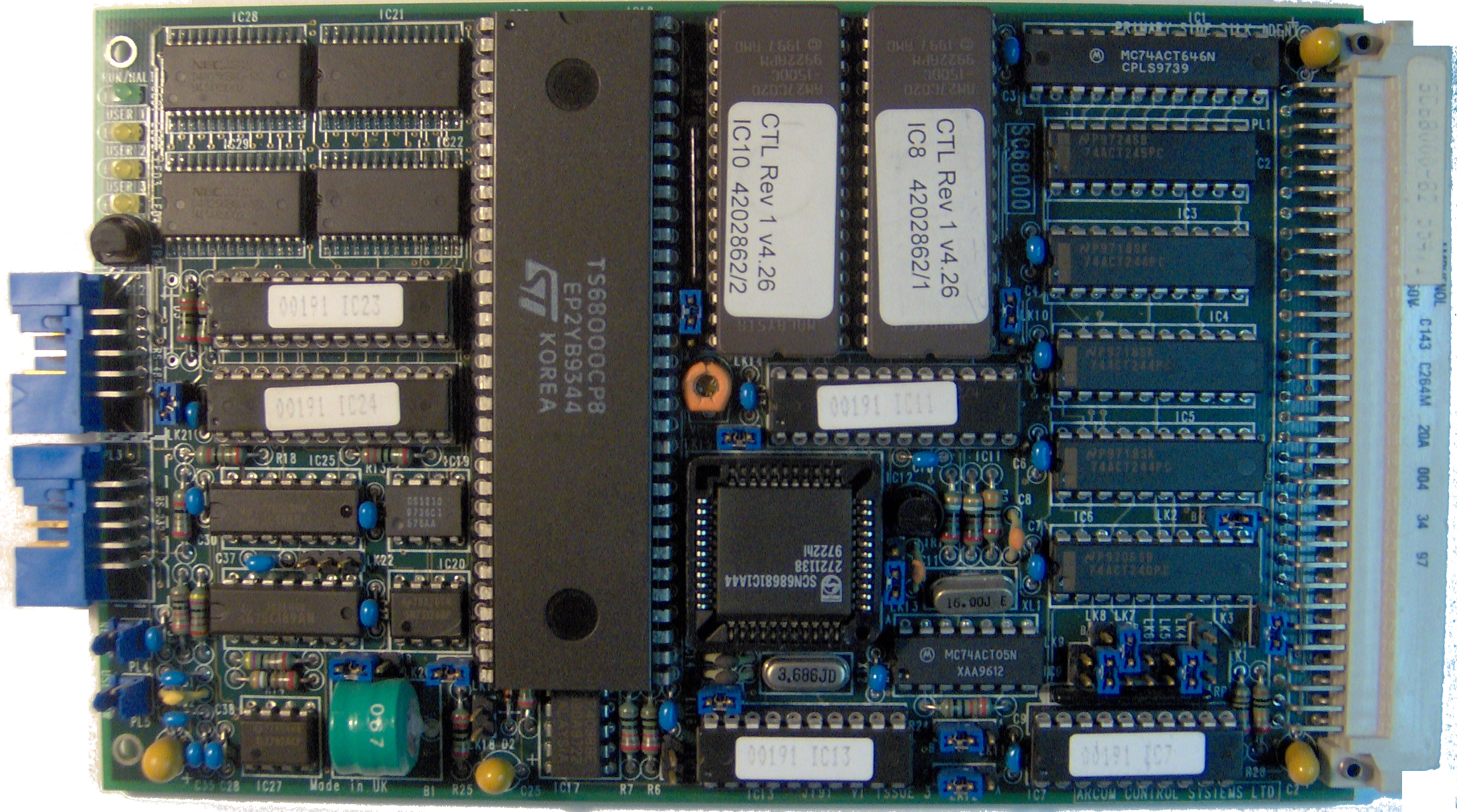
STEbus 68000 processor

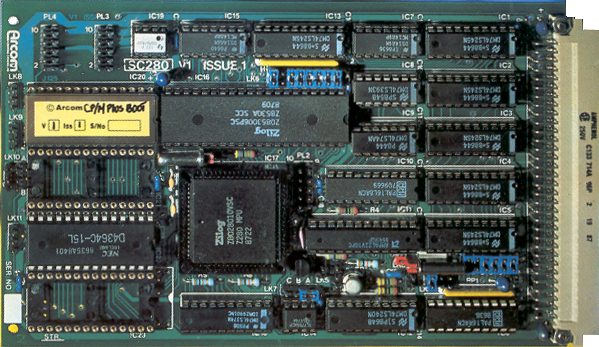
STEbus Z280 processor

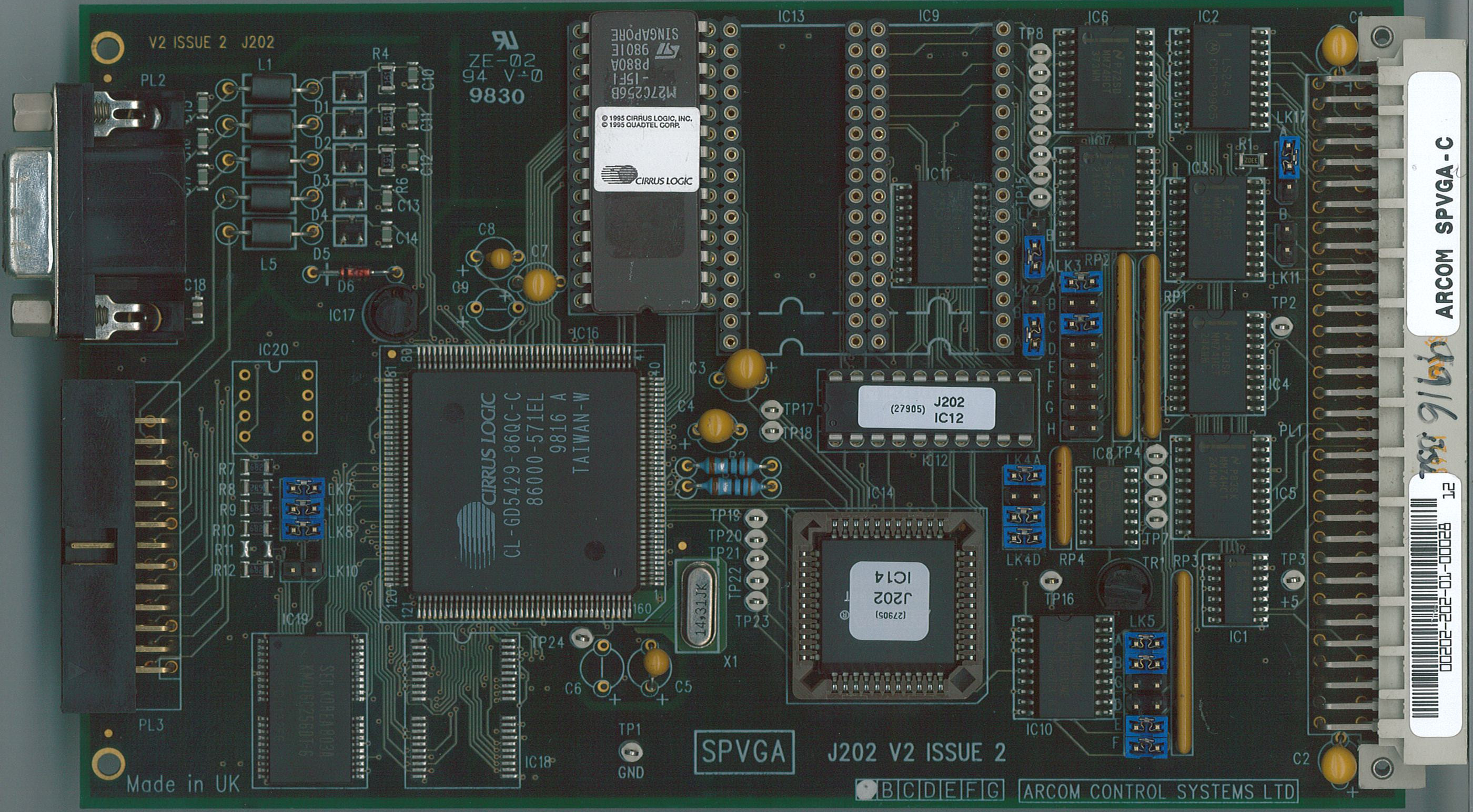
STEbus VGA and LCD board

The STEbus (also called the IEEE-1000 bus) is a non-proprietary, processor-independent, computer bus with 8 data lines and 20 address lines. It was popular for industrial control systems in the late 1980s and early 1990s before the ubiquitous IBM PC dominated this market. STE stands for STandard Eurocard.

Although no longer competitive in its original market, it is a valid choice for hobbyists wishing to make 'home brew' computer systems. The Z80 and probably the CMOS 65C02 are possible processors to use. The standardized bus allows hobbyists to interface to each other's designs.

== Origins ==
In the early 1980s, there were many proprietary bus systems, each with its own strengths and weaknesses. Most had grown in an ad-hoc manner, typically around a particular microprocessor. The S-100 bus is based on Intel 8080 signals, the STD Bus around Z80 signals, the SS-50 bus around the Motorola 6800, and the G64 bus around 6809 signals. This made it harder to interface other processors. Upgrading to a more powerful processor would subtly change the timings, and timing constraints were not always tightly specified. Nor were electrical parameters and physical dimensions. They usually used edge-connectors for the bus, which were vulnerable to dirt and vibration.

The VMEbus had provided a high-quality solution for high-performance 16-bit processors, using reliable DIN 41612 connectors and well-specified Eurocard board sizes and rack systems. However, these were too costly where an application only needed a modest 8-bit processor.

In the mid 1980s, the STEbus standard addressed these issues by specifying what is rather like a VMEbus simplified for 8-bit processors. The bus signals are sufficiently generic so that they are easy for 8-bit processors to interface with. The board size was usually a single-height Eurocard (100 mm x 160 mm) but allowed for double-height boards (233 x 160 mm) as well. The latter positioned the bus connector so that it could neatly merge into VME-bus systems.

IEEE Working Group P1000 initially considered simply repinning the STD Bus, replacing its card edge connector with the DIN41612 connector. But they decided to create a completely new high-performance 8-bit bus. They decided to make a bus more like the VMEbus and Futurebus. The STEbus was designed to be manufacturer independent, processor independent, and have multimaster capability.

== Maturity ==
The STEbus was very successful in its day. It was given the official standard IEEE1000-1987.

Many processors were available on STEbus cards, across a range of price and performance. These boards included the Intel 8031, 8085, 8088, 80188; the National Semiconductor 32008 and 32016; the Motorola 6809, 68000, and 68008; The Zilog Z80 and Z280; the Hitachi HD64180; and the Inmos Transputer.

The STEbus is designed for 8-bit microprocessors. Processors that normally use a wider data bus (16-bit, etc.) can use the STEbus if the processor can handle data in byte-wide chunks, giving the slave as long as it needs to respond.

The STEbus supported processors from the popular Z80, the 6809, to the 68020. The only popular micro notably absent was the 6502, because it did not naturally support wait-states while writing. The CMOS 65C02 did not have this shortcoming, but this was rarer and more expensive than the NMOS 6502 and Z80. The 6809 used cycle stretching.

Peripheral boards included prototyping boards, disc controllers, video cards, serial I/O, analogue and digital I/O. The STEbus achieved its goal of providing a rack-mounting system robust enough for industrial use, with easily interchangeable boards and processor independence.

Researchers describe STEbus systems as rugged, adaptable, and cost effective.

== Decline ==
The STEbus market began to decline as the IBM PC made progress into industrial control systems. Customers opted for PC-based products as the software base was larger and cheaper. More programmers were familiar with the PC and did not have to learn new systems.

Memory costs fell, so there was less reason to have bus-based memory expansion when one could have plenty on the processor board. So despite the disadvantages, manufacturers created industrial PC systems and eventually dropped other bus systems. As time went on, PC systems did away with the need for card cages and backplanes by moving to the PC/104 format where boards stack onto each other. While not as well-designed as the STEbus, PC/104 is good enough for many applications. The major manufacturers from its peak period now support STEbus mostly for goodwill with old customers who bought a lot of product from them.

As of 2013, some manufacturers still support STEbus, G64, Multibus II, and other legacy bussed systems.

The IEEE have withdrawn the standard, not because of any faults but because it is no longer active enough to update.

== Physical format ==
3U Eurocard - The most common size was the 100 x 160 mm Eurocard.

6U Eurocard - Rare, sometimes used in VMEbus hybrid boards

== Connector ==
DIN 41612, rows a and c, 0.1" pitch.

VME/STE hybrid boards have the STEbus and VMEbus sharing the VME P2 connector, VME signals on row b. For this reason, STEbus boards may not use row b for any purpose.

== Pinout ==
STEbus pinout Seen looking into backplane socket
num.	name	a b c	name
1	GND	o + o	GND
2	+5V	o + o	+5V
3	D0	o + o	D1
4	D2	o + o	D3
5	D4	o + o	D5
6	D6	o + o	D7
7	A0	o + o	GND
8	A2	o + o	A1
9	A4	o + o	A3
10	A6	o + o	A5
11	A8	o + o	A7
12	A10	o + o	A9
13	A12	o + o	A11
14	A14	o + o	A13
15	A16	o + o	A15
16	A18	o + o	A17
17	CM0	o + o	A19
18	CM2	o + o	CM1
19	ADRSTB*	o + o	GND
20	DATACK*	o + o	DATSTB*
21	TFRERR*	o + o	GND
22	ATNRQ0*	o + o	SYSRST*
23	ATNRQ2*	o + o	ATNRQ1*
24	ATNRQ4*	o + o	ATNRQ3*
25	ATNRQ6*	o + o	ATNRQ5*
26	GND	o + o	ATNRQ7*
27	BUSRQ0*	o + o	BUSRQ1*
28	BUSAK0*	o + o	BUSAK1*
29	SYSCLK	o + o	VSTBY
30	-12V	o + o	+12V
31	+5V	o + o	+5V
32	GND	o + o	GND

Active low signals indicated by asterisk.

GND: Ground reference voltage

+5V: Powers most logic.

+12V and -12V: Primarily useful for RS232 buffer power. The +12V has been used for programming voltage generators. Both can be used in analogue circuitry, but note that these are primarily power rails for digital circuitry and as such they often have digital noise. Some decoupling or local regulation is recommended for analogue circuitry.

VSTBY: Standby voltage. Optional. This line is specified as 5V (+0 to +5%), at up to 1A. However, some boards have used this line for carrying a battery backup voltage to boards that supply or consume it. A 3.6V NiCad battery is a common source. The STEbus spec is not rigid about where this should be sourced from.

In practice, this means that most boards requiring backup power tend to play safe and have a battery on board, often with a link to allow them to supply or accept power from VSTBY. Hence you can end up with more batteries in your system than you need, and you must then take care that no more than one battery is driving VSTBY.

D0...7: Data bus. This is only 8-bits wide, but most I/O or memory-mapped peripherals are byte-oriented.

A0...19: Address bus. This allows up to 1 MB of memory to be addressed. Current technology is such that processor requiring large amounts of memory have this on the processor board, so this is not a great limitation. I/O space is limited to 4K, to simplify I/O address decoding to a practical level. A single 74LS688 on each slave board can decode A11...A4 to locate I/O slave boards at any I/O address with 16-byte alignment. Typically 8 small jumpers or a single unit of 8 DIP switches or two binary-coded hexadecimal rotary switches are used to give each I/O slave board a unique address.

CM0...2: Command Modifiers. These indicate the nature of the data transfer cycle.

Command modifiers
CM 2 1 0	Function	
1 1 1	read	memory
1 1 0	write	memory
1 0 1	read	I/O
1 0 0	write	I/O
0 1 1	Vector-fetch	
0 1 0	reserved	
0 0 1	reserved	
0 0 0	reserved	

A simple processor board can drive CM2 high for all bus access, drive CM1 from a memory/not_IO signal, and CM0 from a read/not_write signal. CM2 low state is used only during "attention request" phases (for interrupts and/or DMA cycles) for Explicit Response mode. When Implicit Response mode is used, the bus master polls the slave boards to find which one has triggered the Attention Request and reset the signal source. In that case, Vector-fetch is not used.

ATNRQ0...7*: Attention Requests. These are reserved for boards to signal for processor attention, a term which covers Interrupts and Direct Memory Access (DMA). The wise choice of signal does not commit these lines to being specific types, such as maskable interrupts, non-maskable interrupts, or DMA.

The number of Attention Requests reflects the intended role of the STEbus, in real-time control systems. Eight lines can be priority encoded into three bits, and is a reasonably practical number of lines to handle.

BUSRQ0...1* and BUSAK0...1*: Bus Requests and Bus Acknowledge. Optional. Used by multi-master systems.

The number of Attention Requests reflects that the STEbus aims to be simple. Single-master systems are the norm, but these signals allow systems to have secondary bus masters if needed.

DATSTB*: Data Strobe. This is the primary signal in data transfer cycles.

DATACK*: Data Acknowledge. A slave will assert this signal when to acknowledge the safe completion of a data transfer via the STEbus. This allows STEbus systems to use plug-in cards with a wide variety of speeds, an improvement on earlier bus systems that require everything to run at the speed of the slowest device.

TFRERR*: Transfer Error. A slave will assert this signal when acknowledging the erroneous completion of a data transfer via the STEbus.

ADRSTB*: Address Strobe. This signal indicates the address bus is valid. Originally, this had some practical use in DRAM boards which could start strobing the address lines into DRAM chips before the data bus was ready. The STEbus spec was later firmed up to say that slaves were not allowed to start transfers until DATSTB* was ready, so ADRSTB* has become quite redundant. Nowadays, STEbus masters can simply generate DATSTB* and ADRSTB* from the same logic signal. Slaves simply note when DATSTB* is valid (since the bus definition insists that the address will also be valid at the same time as the data). ADRSTB* also allows a bus master to retain ownership of the bus during indivisible read-modify-write cycles, by remaining active during two DATSTB* pulses. The sequence matches that of the 68008's bus. Other CPUs may require additional logic to create read-modify-write cycles.

SYSCLK: System Clock. Fixed at 16 MHz. 50% duty cycle.

SYSRST*: System Reset.

The backplane connects all the DIN connectors in parallel. So a STEbus expansion card sees the same signals no matter which slot of the backplane it is plugged into.

== Types of signals ==
Signal	Type
A[19..0]	Tri-state
D[7..0]	Tri-state
CM[2..0]	Tri-state
ADRSTB*	Tri-state
DATSTB*	Tri-state
DATACK*	Open collector / Open drain
BUSRQ[1..0]*	Open collector / Open drain
TFRERR*	Open collector / Open drain
ATNREQ[7..0]*	Open collector / Open drain
SYSRST*	Open collector / Open drain
SYSCLK	Totem-pole
BUSAK[1..0]*	Totem-pole

The SYSCLK must be driven by only one board in the system. As explained in the standard, this signal shall be generated by the System Controller.

The System Controller is also in charge of the Bus Arbitration in case there are multiple masters. When there is only one Master, the System Controller is not needed, and SYSCLK can be generated by the Master board

== Technical notes ==
- Signal inputs must be Schmitt trigger
- Only one TTL load per bus line signal per board
- Signal outputs must have a fanout of 20
- Backplane can have up to 21 sockets
- 50mm maximum length of bus signal line PCB trace on any board
- 500 mm maximum length of bus signal line length
- Active bus-termination recommended (270R pull-up to 2.8V)
- 7400 series chips are often used to build custom control boards, directly connected to the STEbus.
