= PICMG 2.4 =

PICMG 2.4 is a specification by PICMG that standardizes user IO pin mappings from ANSI/VITA standard IP sites to J3/P3, J4/P4, and J5/P5 on a CompactPCI backplane.

== Status ==
Adopted: 9 September 1998

Current revision: 1.0
