= PICMG 2.5 =

Computer telephony specification

PICMG 2.5 is a specification by PICMG that standardizes the utilization of CompactPCI user definable pins for the computer telephony functions of standard TDM bus, telephony rear IO, 48 VDC and ringing distribution in a 6U chassis environment.

== Status ==
- Adopted : 4/3/1998
- Current Revision : 1.0
