= PICMG =

- PCI Industrial Computer Manufacturers Group
- Formation: 1994; 32 years ago
- Type: Nonprofit, consortium
- Purpose: Developing open modular computing specifications
- Headquarters: Wakefield, Massachusetts, U.S.
- Coordinates: 42.52399757753517°N 71.04132761719929°W
- Members: 140+ companies
- Website: www.picmg.org

PICMG, or PCI Industrial Computer Manufacturers Group, is a consortium of over 140 companies in the fields of computer science and engineering. Founded in 1994, the group was originally formed to adapt PCI technology for use in non-desktop, high-performance telecommunications, military, and industrial computing applications, but its work has grown to include newer technologies. PICMG currently focuses on developing and implementing specifications and guidelines for open standards–based computer architectures from a wide variety of interconnects.

== History ==
The original PICMG mission was to provide extensions to the PCI standard developed by PCI-SIG for a range of applications. The organization's collaborations eventually expanded to include a variety of interconnect technologies for industrial computing and telecommunications. PICMG's specifications are used in a wide variety of industries including industrial automation, military, aerospace, telecommunications, medical, gaming, transportation, physics/research, test and measurement, energy, drone/robotics, and general embedded computing.

In 2011, PICMG completed its transfer of assets from the Communications Platforms Trade Association (CP-TA). Since 2006, CP-TA had been a collaboration of communications vendors, developing interoperability testing requirements, methodologies, and procedures based on open specifications from PICMG, The Linux Foundation, and the Service Availability Forum. PICMG has continued the educational and marketing outreach formerly conducted by members of the CP-TA marketing work group.

== Specification naming convention ==
For many years, PICMG used a numerical naming convention with specification being referred to as “PICMG X.YY”. Where X was used to denote differing form factors ("1" for slot card based single board computers, "2" for CompactPCI, and "3" for AdvancedTCA) while YY was used to indicate incremental changes, option definitions, or a slight variation of a specification form its core specification. In 2003, PICMG added an acronym-based naming convention for its specifications to yield better results from internet search engines. Specifications are now often named ABCD.X where ABCD is an acronym of the specification. In this naming convention, base or main specifications are denoted with X=0 (i.e. ABCD.0), and PICMG subsidiary specifications are denoted X>0. PICMG subsidiary specifications represent how various options or variations of a based specification should be handled.

== List of adopted specifications ==
- PICMG 1.0 – PCI/ISA
- PICMG 1.1 – PCI/ISA Bridging
- PICMG 1.2 – PCI only
- PICMG 1.3 – SHB Express
- PICMG 2.0 – CompactPCI
- PICMG 2.1 – CompactPCI Hotswap
- PICMG 2.2 – CompactPCI VME64x
- PICMG 2.3 – CompactPCI PMC I/O
- PICMG 2.4 – CompactPCI IP I/O
- PICMG 2.5 – CompactPCI Telephony
- PICMG 2.7 – Dual CompactPCI
- PICMG 2.9 – CompactPCI Management
- PICMG 2.10 – CompactPCI Keying
- PICMG 2.11 – CompactPCI Power Interface
- PICMG 2.12 – CompactPCI Software Interoperability
- PICMG 2.14 – CompactPCI Multicomputing
- PICMG 2.15 – CompactPCI PTMC
- PICMG 2.16 – CompactPCI Packet Switching Backplane (PSB)
- PICMG 2.17 – CompactPCI Starfabric
- PICMG 2.18 – CompactPCI RapidIO
- PICMG 2.20 – CompactPCI Serial Mesh
- PICMG 2.30 – CompactPCI PlusIO
- CPCI-S.0 – CompactPCI Serial
- CPCI-S.1 – CompactPCI Serial for Space
- PICMG 3.0 – AdvancedTCA Base
- PICMG 3.1 – AdvancedTCA Ethernet
- PICMG 3.2 – AdvancedTCA Infiniband
- PICMG 3.3 – AdvancedTCA StarFabric
- PICMG 3.4 – AdvancedTCA PCI Express
- PICMG 3.5 – AdvancedTCA RapidIO
- PICMG 3.7 – AdvancedTCA Extensions
- AMC.0 – AdvancedMC Mezzanine Module
- AMC.1 – AdvancedMC PCI Express and AS
- AMC.2 – AdvancedMC Ethernet
- AMC.3 – AdvancedMC Storage
- AMC.4 – AdvancedMC Serial RapidIO
- IRTM.0 – Intelligent Rear Transition Module
- SFP.0 – System Fabric Plane
- SFP.1 – iTDM
- EXP.0 – CompactPCI Express
- COM.0 – Computer on Module
- CDG – COM Design Guide
- MTCA.0 – MicroTCA
- MTCA.1 – Air-cooled rugged MicroTCA
- MTCA.3 – Hardened conduction-cooled MicroTCA
- MTCA.4 – MicroTCA Enhancements for Rear I/O & Precision Timing

== See also ==
- PCI-SIG
- Eurocard (printed circuit board)
