= P112 =

The P112 is a stand-alone 8-bit CPU board. Typically running CP/M or a similar operating system, it provides a Z80182 (Z80 upgrade) CPU with up to 1MB of SRAM memory, 32KB of in-system programmable flash ROM, serial, parallel and diskette I/O, and a real-time clock, in a 3.5-inch drive form factor. Powered solely from 5V, it draws 150mA (nominal: not including disk drives) with a 16 MHz CPU clock. Clock speeds up to 24.576 MHz are possible.

The P112 is notable because it was the first of the hobbyist single-board computers to reach the production stage. The P112 hobbyist computers were relatively widespread and inspired other hobbyist centered home brew computing projects such as N8VEM home brew computing project. The P112 project still maintains many devoted enthusiasts and has an online repository of software and other information.

The P112 computer originated as a commercial product of "D-X Designs Pty Ltd" of Australia in 1996. As of August 2016, Dave Brooks has released the hardware and software components of P112 into the public domain, under the GPL. The PCB layout is available in the original Protel format, and translated into the current Altium Designer 16 format, which many PCB fabricators can accept.

The P112 board was last available new in 1996 by Dave Brooks. In late 2004 on the Usenet newsgroup comp.os.cpm, talk about making another run of P112 boards was discussed. David Griffith decided to produce additional P112 kits with Dave Brooks' blessing and the assistance of others. In addition Terry Gulczynski makes additional P112 derivative hobbyist home brew computers. Hal Bower was very active in the mid-1990s on the P112 project and the commercial "Banked/Portable BIOS" CP/M-compatible operating system was sold for the P112 between 1992 and 1999. It has now been released as open source under the GPL license.
