= Eurocard (printed circuit board) =

Standard for PCBs which may be interconnected in a rack mounted chassis

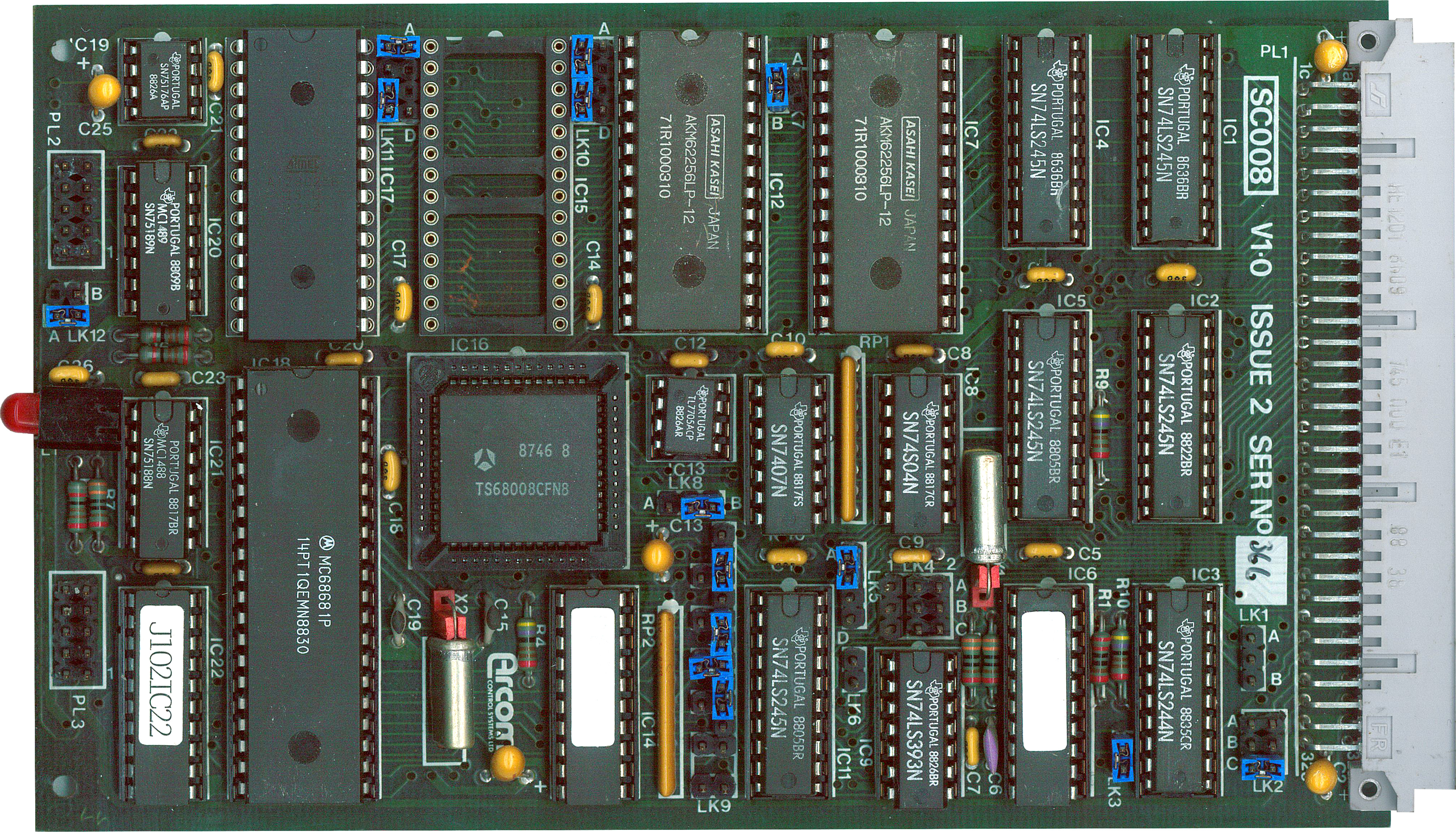
STEbus 68008 processor on 100x160mm Eurocard

Eurocard is an IEEE standard format for printed circuit board (PCB) cards that can be plugged together into a standard chassis which, in turn, can be mounted in a 19-inch rack. The chassis consists of a series of slotted card guides on the top and bottom, into which the cards are slid so they stand on end, like books on a shelf. At the spine of each card is one or more connectors which plug into mating connectors on a backplane that closes the rear of the chassis.

== Dimensions ==
As the cards are assumed to be installed in a vertical orientation, the usual meanings of height and width are transposed: A card might be 233.35 mm "high", but only 20 mm "wide". Height is measured in rack units, "U", with 1 U being 1.75 in (44.45 mm). This dimension refers to the subrack in which the card is to be mounted, rather than the card itself.

A single card is 100 mm high. Taller cards add a 133.35 mm, so that a double height card is 233.35 mm high and a triple 366.7 mm high.

Enclosure heights are multiples of 3U, with the cards always 33.35 mm (1.313 in) shorter than the enclosure. Two common heights are 3U (a 100 mm card in a 5.25 in (133.35 mm) subrack) and 6U (a 233.35 mm card in a 10.5 in (266.70 mm) high subrack). As two 3U cards are shorter than a 6U card (by 33.35 mm), it is possible to install two 3U cards in one slot of a 6U subrack, with a mid-height structure for proper support.

Card widths are specified in horizontal pitch units "HP", with 1 HP being 0.20 in (5.08 mm).

Card depths start at 100 mm (3.937 in) and increase in 60 mm (2.362 in) increments. The most common today is 160 mm (6.299 in), but standard hardware is available for depths of 100 mm (3.937 in), 160 mm (6.299 in), 220 mm (8.661 in), 280 mm (11.024 in), 340 mm (13.386 in), and 400 mm (15.748 in).

Valid Eurocard sizes. Dimensions in mm. Connectors on the right.
						↑ 366.7; Triple-height (9U) subrack	↑ board height +0/−0.3
						↑ 233.35; Double-height (6U) subrack	↑ board height +0/−0.3
						↑ 100; Single-height (3U) subrack	↑ board height +0/−0.3
← 400	← 340	← 280	← 220	← 160	← 100		
← board depth +0/−0.3

== Standards and architecture ==
The Eurocard mechanical architecture was defined originally under IEC-60297-3. Today, the most widely recognized standards for this mechanical structure are IEEE 1101.1, IEEE 1101.10 (also known commonly as "dot ten") and IEEE 1101.11. IEEE 1101.10 covers the additional mechanical and electromagnetic interference features required for VITA 1.1-1997(R2002), which is the VME64 Extensions standard, as well as PICMG 2.0 (R3.0), which is the CompactPCI specification.

The IEEE 1101.11 standard covers rear plug-in units that are also called rear transition modules or RTMs.

The Eurocard is a mechanical system and does not define the specific connector to be used or the signals that are assigned to connector contacts.

The connector systems that are commonly used with Eurocard architectures include the original DIN 41612 connector that is also standardized as IEC 60603.2. This is the connector that is used for the VMEbus standard, which was IEEE 1014. The connector known as the 5-row DIN, which is used for the VME64 Extensions standard is IEC 61076-4-113. The VME64 Extension architecture defined by VITA 1.1-1997 (R2002).

Another popular computer architecture that utilizes the 6U-160 Eurocard is CompactPCI and CompactPCI Express. These are defined by PICMG 2.0R3 and PICMG Exp0 R1 respectively. Other computer architectures that utilize the Eurocard system are VME eXtensions for Instrumentation (VXI), PCI eXtensions for Instrumentation (PXI), and PXI Express.

A computer architecture that used the 6U-220 Eurocard format was Multibus-II, which was IEEE 1296.

Because the Eurocard system provided for so many modular card sizes and because connector manufacturers have continued to create new connectors that are compatible with this system, it is a popular mechanical standard that is also used for innumerable "one-off" applications.

Conduction-cooled Eurocards are used in military and aerospace applications. They are defined by the IEEE 1101.2-1992 (2001) standard.

The Eurocard standard is also the basis of the "Eurorack" format for modular electronic music synthesizers, popularized by Doepfer and other manufacturers.

== See also ==
- STEbus
- VMEbus
- Europe Card Bus
