= RPE2 =

RPE2, or Relative server Performance Estimate 2, is a computer benchmark developed by Ideas International to compare the relative performance of servers built on x86, IA-64, and RISC processor architectures.

The benchmark is a composite of results, or estimated results, from the SAP SD Standard Application Two-Tier benchmark, TPC-C, TPC-H, SPECjbb2005, SPECint, and SPECfp benchmarks. The benchmark was created in 2005, replacing an earlier benchmark called RPE.

RPE2 data is incorporated into some server capacity planning tools, such as the ATS Server Consolidation Monitor from IBM and Data Center Intelligence software from CIRBA.

== See also ==
- Benchmark (computing)
- SPECint
- SPECfp
- Transaction Processing Performance Council
- Standard Performance Evaluation Corporation
