= ICOMP (index) =

Intel CPU performance index

Various CPUs marked with iCOMP index's.

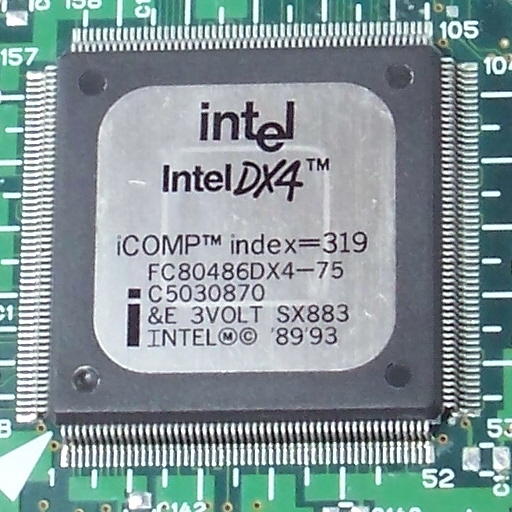
i486 DX4 75 MHz
iCOMP=319

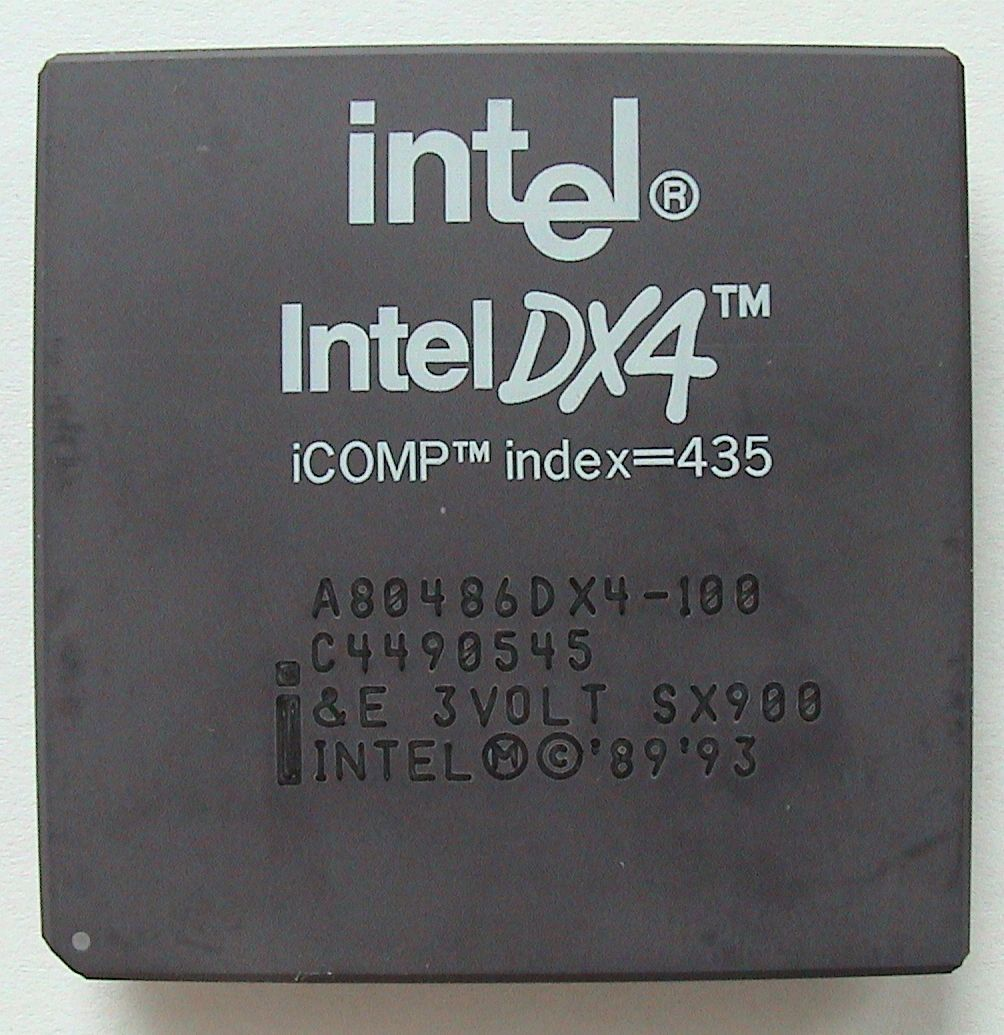
i486 DX4 100 MHz
iCOMP = 435

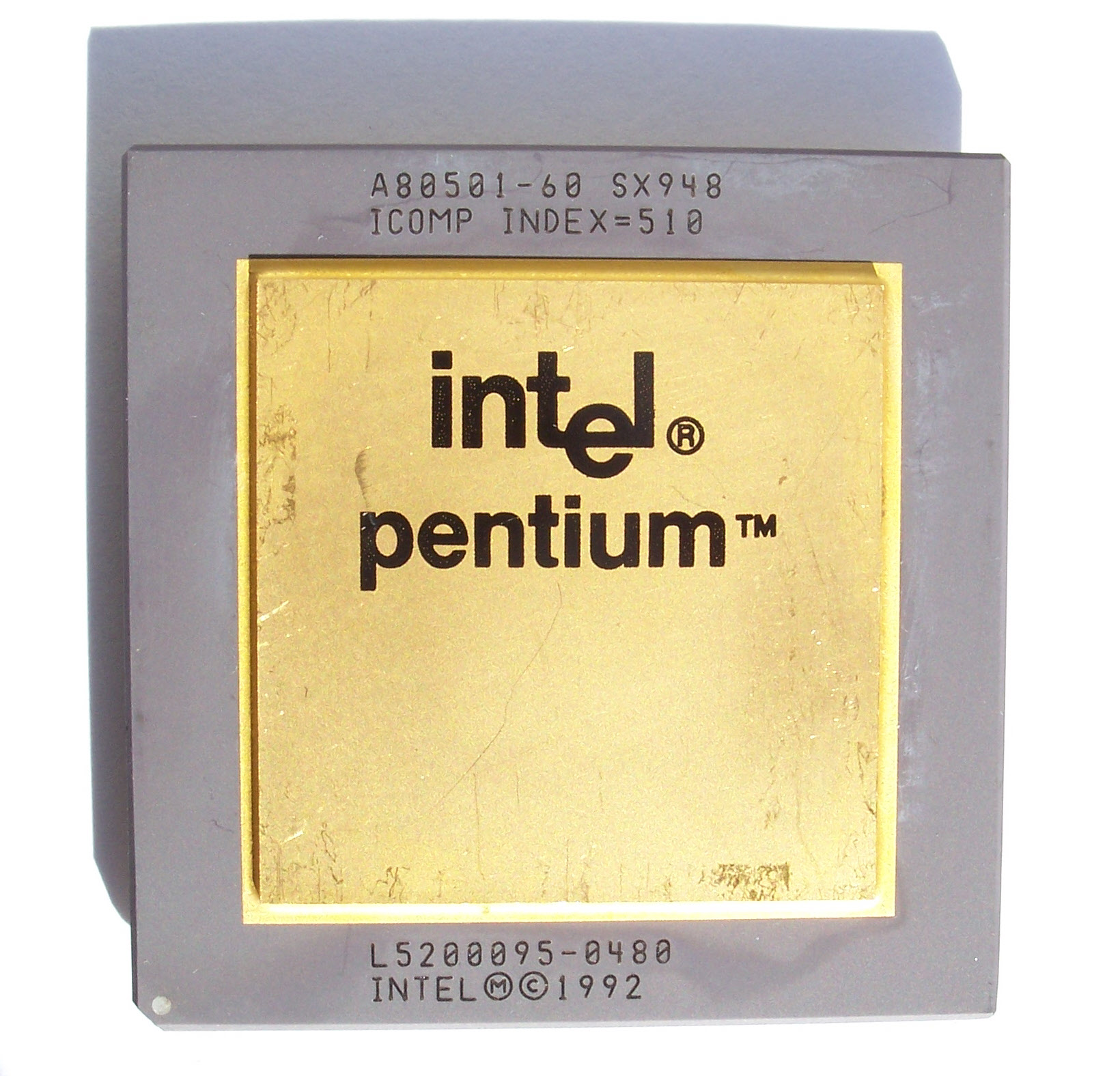
Pentium 60 MHz
iCOMP = 510

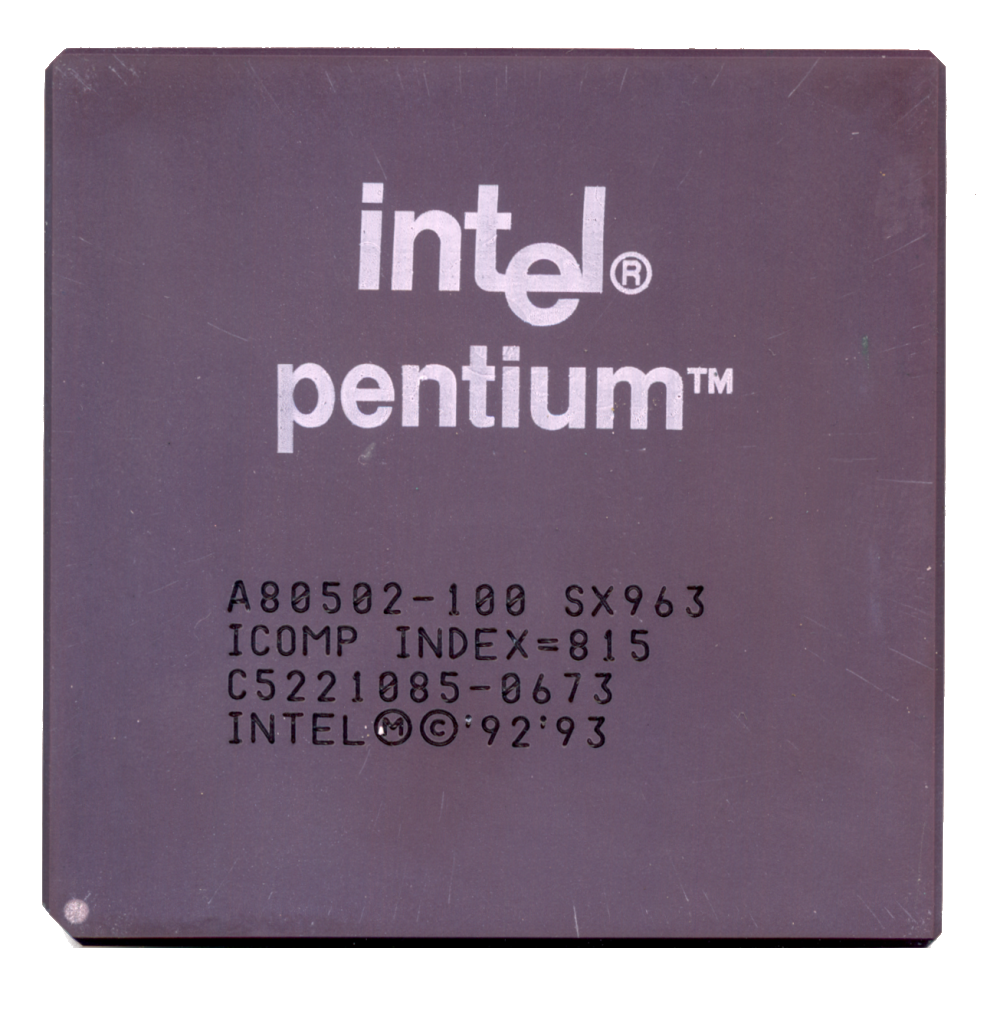
Pentium 100 MHz
iComp = 815

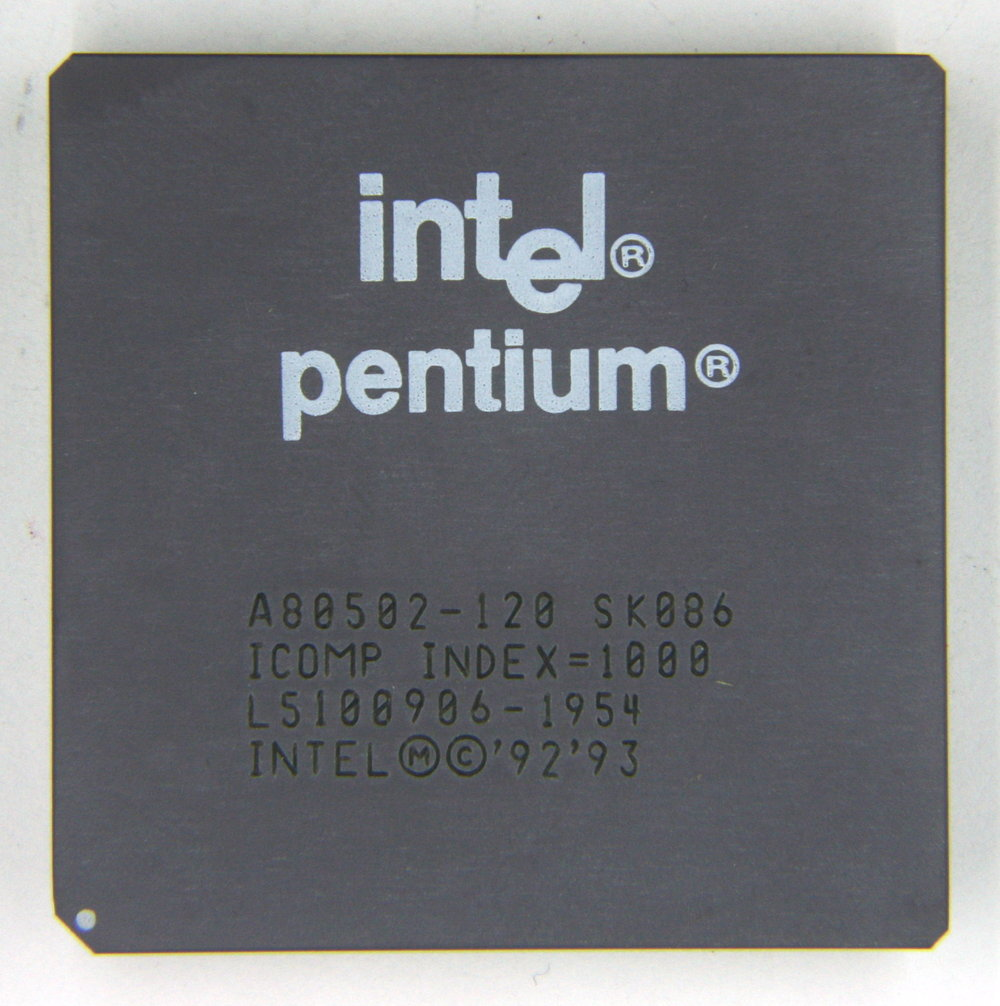
Pentium 120 MHz
iCOMP = 1000

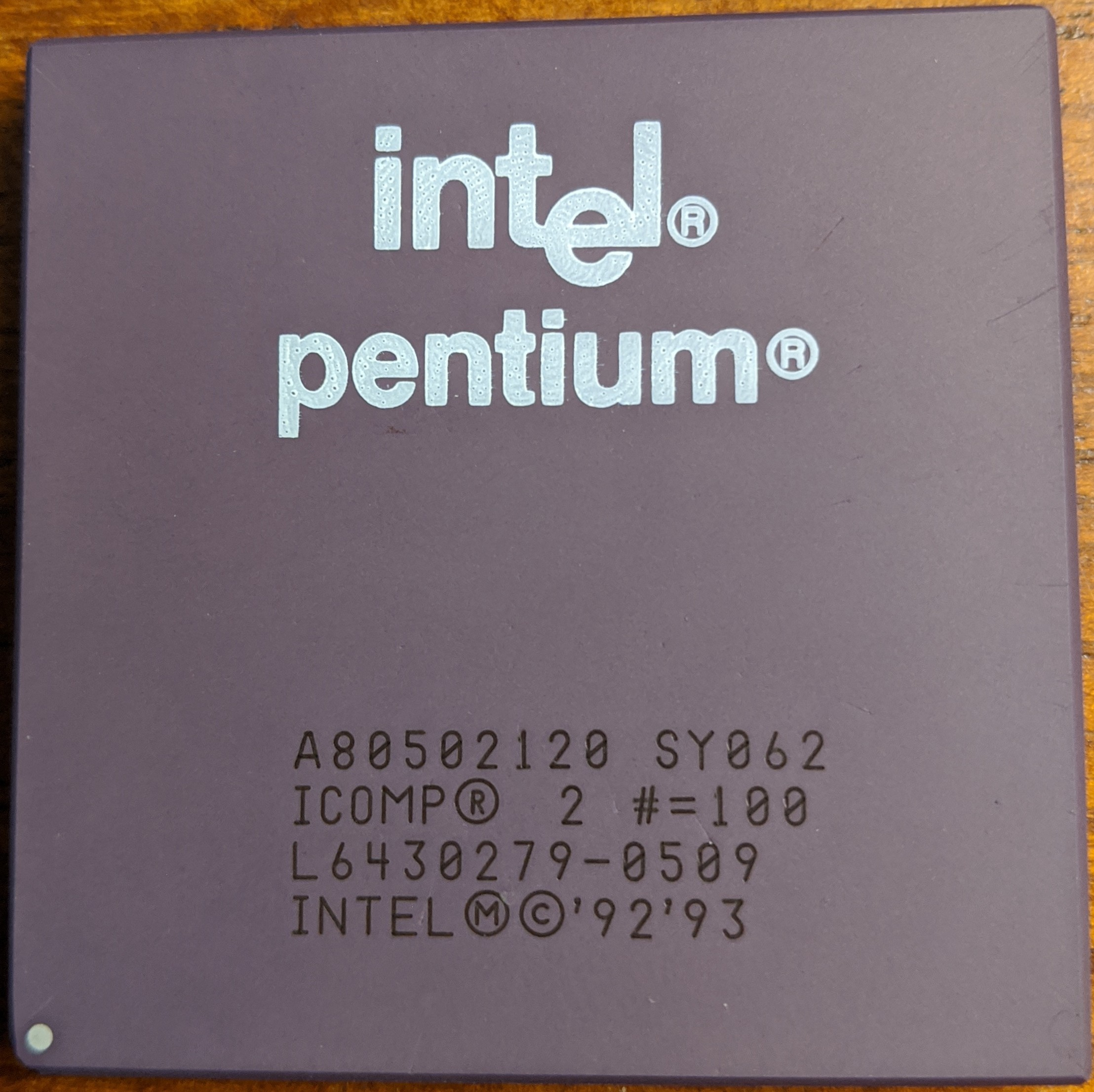
Pentium 120 MHz
iCOMP 2 = 100

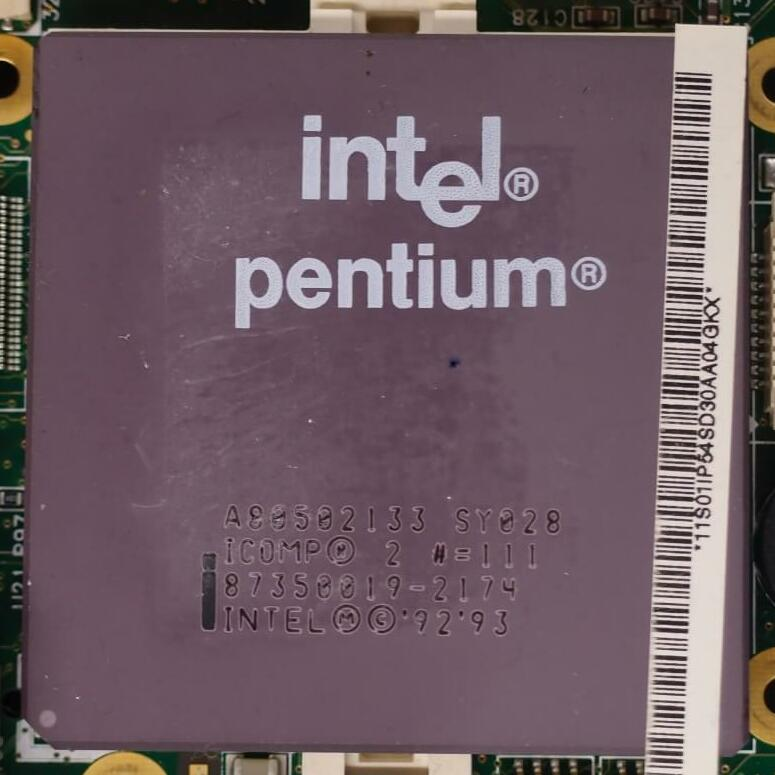
Pentium 133 MHz
iCOMP 2 = 111

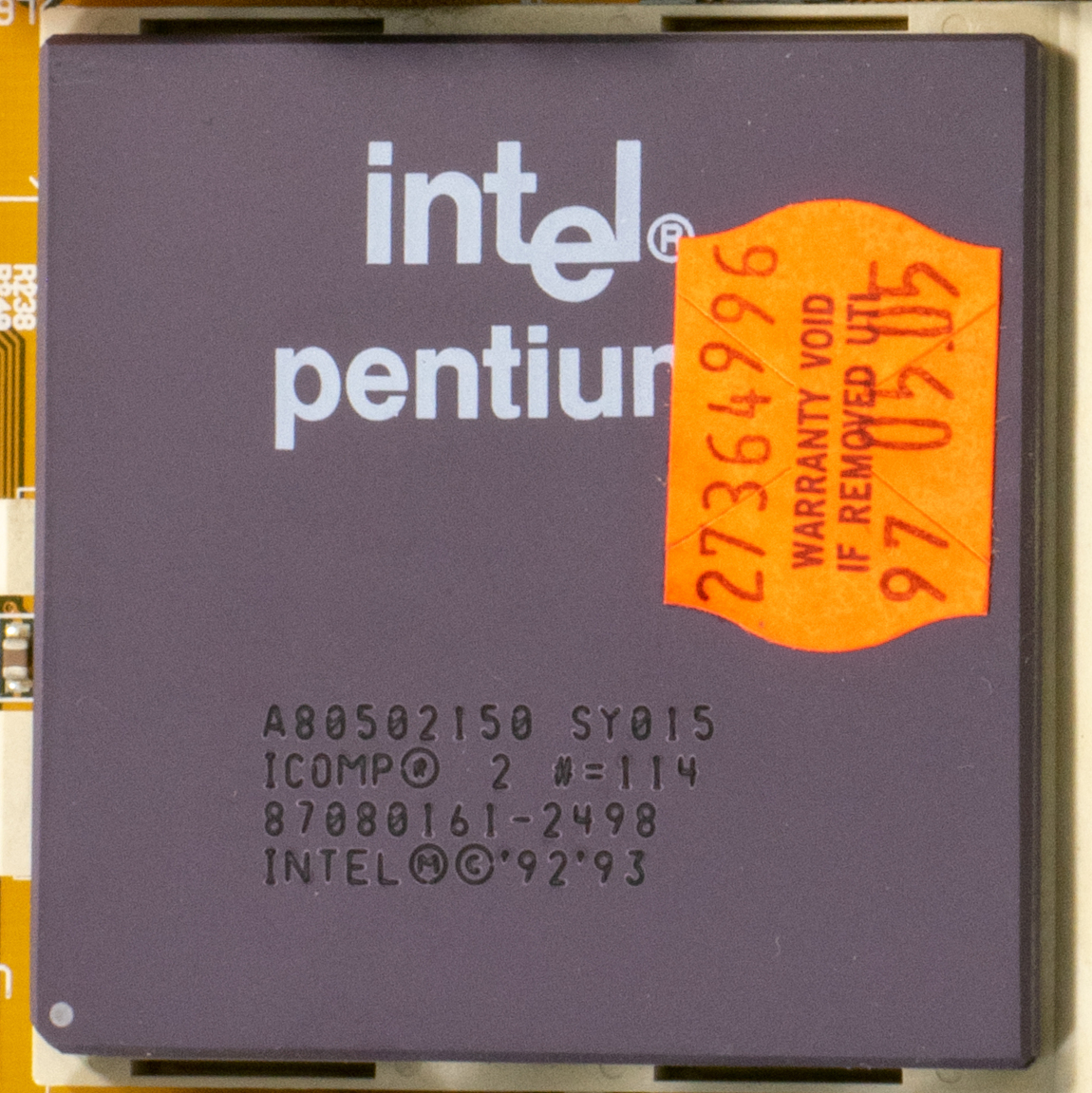
Pentium 150 MHz
iCOMP 2 = 114

iCOMP (for Intel Comparative Microprocessor Performance) was an index published by Intel used to measure the relative performance of its microprocessors.

Intel was motivated to create the iCOMP rating by research which showed that many computer buyers assumed that the clock speed – the “MHz” rating – was indicative of performance, regardless of the processor type. iCOMP ratings based on standard benchmarks. The formula for calculating iCOMPs is like this:

Category	Benchmark	Weight
16-bit Integer	ZDbenchCPU	52%
16-bit Floating-Point	16-bit Whetstone	2%
16-bit Floating-Point	ZDbenchCPU	1%
16-bit Graphics	ZDbenchCPU*	10%
16-bit Video	ZDbenchCPU*	5%
32-bit Integer	SPECint92	15%
32-bit Floating-Point	SPECfp92	5%
32-bit Graphics	SPECint92*	5%
32-bit Video	SPECint92*	5%

The largest component is the integer CPU benchmark from Ziff-Davis Labs (ZDbenchCPU), which is derived from the earlier PC Labs benchmarks. Whetstone (as implemented in PowerMeter) is used for 16-bit floating-point, and SPECint92 and SPECfp92 are used for the 32-bit components.

There were three revisions of the iCOMP index. Version 1.0 (1992) was benchmarked against the 486SX 25, while version 2.0 (1996) was benchmarked against the Pentium 120. For Version 3.0 (1999) it was Pentium II at 350 MHz.

Intel iCOMP (Full List)
CPU Name	Clock (MHz)	iCOMP 3.0	iCOMP 2.0	iCOMP 1.0
Pentium III	1000	3280		
Pentium III	933	3100		
Pentium III	866	2890		
Pentium III	800	2690		
Pentium III	750	2540		
Pentium III	700	2420		
Pentium III	650	2270		
Pentium III E	600	2110		
Pentium III	600	1930		
Pentium III	550	1780		
Pentium III	500	1650		
Pentium III	450	1500		
Pentium II	450	1240	483	
Pentium II	400	1130	440	
Celeron	400	1011	394	
Pentium II OverDrive	333	1001	387	
Pentium II	350	1000	386	
Pentium II	333	940	366	
Pentium II OverDrive	300		351	
Celeron	366	890	344	
Pentium II	300		332	
Celeron	333		318	
Pentium II	266		303	
Celeron A	300		296	
Pentium II	233		267	
Celeron	300		226	
Pentium Pro 256K	200		220	
Celeron	266		213	
Pentium MMX	233		203	
Pentium Pro 256K	180		197	
Pentium Pro 512K	166		186	
Pentium MMX	200		182	
Pentium OverDrive MMX 200	200		181	
Pentium Pro 256K	150		168	
Pentium OverDrive MMX 180	180		163	
Pentium MMX	166		160	
Pentium OverDrive MMX 166	166		157	
Pentium MMX	150		144	
Pentium OverDrive MMX 150	150		144	
Pentium	200		142	
Pentium	166		127	1308
Pentium OverDrive	166		127	1308
Pentium OverDrive MMX 150	125		120	
Pentium	150		114	1176
Pentium OverDrive	150		114	1176
Pentium	133		111	1110
Pentium OverDrive	125			1070
Pentium	120		100	1000
Pentium OverDrive	133		84	970
Pentium OverDrive	120		75	877
Pentium	100		90	815
Pentium	90		81	735
Pentium	75		67	610
Pentium OverDrive	83			581
Pentium	66		57	567
Pentium	60		51	510
Pentium OverDrive	63			443
i486 DX4	100			435
i486 DX4	75			319
i486 DX2	66			297
i486 DX	50			249
i486 DX2	50			231
i486 OD-25	50			231
i486 SX2	50			180
i486 DX	33			166
i486 OD-20	40			166
i486 SX	33			136
i486 OD-20	33			132
i486 DX	25			122
i486 SX	25			100
i486 SX	20			78
i386 DX	33			68
i486 SX	16			63
i386 DX	25			49
i386 SL	25			41
i386 SX	25			39
i386 SX	20			32
i386 SX	16			22

== See also ==
- PR rating
