= SDET =

Computer performance benchmark

SDET is a benchmark used in the systems software research community for measuring the throughput of a multi-user computer operating system.

Its name stands for SPEC Software Development Environment Throughput (SDET), and is packaged along with Kenbus in the SPEC SDM91 benchmark.

A more modern benchmark that is related to SDET is the reaim package, which is itself an up-to-date implementation of the venerable AIM Multiuser Benchmark.

== Sources and external links ==
- SDM91
- Perspectives on the SPEC SDET Benchmark
