= List of benchmarking methods and software tools =

Benchmarking requires the use of specific valuation methods. With evaluation it means the level of achieving the target for a particular evaluation item. There are general "methods", approaches as well as IT-supported "software tools" that respectively enable an effective and efficient work.

The following is a list of notable methods and benchmarking software tools.

== Benchmarking methods ==
There are many benchmarking methods each having different analytical focus. The methods are mostly known and will be shown in the following summary.

Methods	Notes
Matrix technology	
Comparison tables	
Graphs: Pie chart, Bar chart and Histogram	
SWOT analysis	
Potential/resources-analysis	
Price/performance ratio	
Potential analysis	
Life cycle analysis	
market growth/market share portfolio	
market attractiveness/competitive strength portfolio	
Portfolio attractiveness customer/supplier position	
Technology/resource strength	
Market position/technology position portfolio	
Contribution margin/cost development portfolio	
Price/customer satisfaction portfolio	
Revenue share/revenue portfolio	
Spider web diagram	

== Benchmarking software tools ==
There are a number software tools that allow the support of different kinds of benchmarking types.

Software	Publisher	Platforms	Type	Notes
Baromitr.com	Subscribe Labs Inc	web-based	Business	This web-based software platform allows any peer group benchmark any performance area of interest. Data is kept secure, identities are kept anonymous and results are shared in a log-in only environment with time-series visualizations and detailed views.
BenchmarkIndex	Winning Moves Ltd	web-based		
Combo Benchmark	Compare to Compete Online Benchmarking	web-based database	Business	This web-based database is suitable for groups of competitors to benchmark individual performance against group performance. All process and performance benchmarks can be processed in this software, providing interesting analysis tools and complete benchmarking report.
Gobench	INDEC GmbH & Co. KG	web-based database	Business	The web-based database supports different kinds of benchmarking categories (product, process, competitor / customer, reverse engineering, marketing, patents, technologies, innovations, ...) and allows reams of analysing possibilities
PassMark	PassMark Software	web-based, automated	Computing	PassMark is a computer benchmark program that scores a user's computer based on its performance. The website provides computer hardware ranking charts which compare performance between CPU, GPU, SSD, HDD, and RAM models.
PowerStats.com	PowerStats Limited, Auckland, NZ	web-based, automated, self-service	Business	PowerStats is a highly automated platform intended to allow groups of competitors to contribute, manage and visualize data for purposes of benchmarking. Participants load raw data on a regular basis, and PowerStats creates relevant KPIs in real-time, making them available via self-service charts and tables via its online interface.
Workload Simulator (WSim)	IBM	mainframe server	Computing	WSim simulates one or many network terminal(s) to load a mainframe computer system by executing programmed scripts, for functional testing, system testing, regression testing, capacity management, benchmarking and stress testing. It is a re-packaged, subset version of IBM's Teleprocessing Network Simulator.
Value Lifecycle Manager	SAP	web-based, automated, self-service	Business	SAP Value Lifecycle Manager (VLM) version = Based on an internal system that has been in use for more than 10 years. After registering, it is self-service for survey capture and provides personalized dashboards. The idea being that you can estimate the value of a business initiative.
UserBenchmark	UserBenchmark	web-based, automated	Computing	UserBenchmark is a computer benchmark program that gives the user's computer hardware scores based on how well their computer performs. The website provides computer hardware ranking charts which compare performance between CPU, GPU, SSD, HDD, RAM, and USB drive models.
Geekbench	Primate Labs	web-based, cross-platform (Windows, Linux, MacOS, IOS, Android)	Computing	Geekbench is a computer benchmark program that measures the daily performance on mundane tasks (ex: writing emails, playing music) based on single core and multicore performance on CPUs and gives you a score rating. The software allows for use on multiple platforms to allow for benchmarking and comparison between different platforms.

== Benchmarking HPC Clusters ==
There are numerous suites for examining the performance of a High Performance Computing cluster, including

- ADEPT – 4 suites relating to energy measurements
- HPCC, HPCG, Linpack
- IMB (Intel MPI Benchmark) – gives rates for common MPI-1 point-to-point and collectives
- Mantevo – series of "mini apps" from Sandia National Labs (SNL)
- NAS and NPB
- SHOC – for accelerators
- Stream (memory b/w)

== See also ==
- Benchmarking
- Best practice
