= Fhourstones =

Type of integer benchmark for the game Connect-4

In computer science, Fhourstones is an integer benchmark that efficiently solves positions in the game of Connect-4. It was written by John Tromp in 1996-2008, and is incorporated into the Phoronix Test Suite. The measurements are reported as the number of game positions searched per second.

Available in both ANSI-C and Java, it is relatively portable and compact (under 500 lines of source), and uses 50Mb of memory. The benchmark involves (after warming up on three easier positions) solving the entire game, which takes about ten minutes on contemporary PCs, scoring between 1000 and 12,000 kpos/sec. It has been described as more realistic than some other benchmarks.

Fhourstones was named as a pun on Dhrystone (itself a pun on Whetstone), as "dhry" sounds the same as "drei", German for "three": fhourstones is an increment on dhrystones.
