= Cycles per instruction =

Aspect of CPU performance

In computer architecture, cycles per instruction (aka clock cycles per instruction, clocks per instruction, or CPI) is one aspect of a processor's performance: the average number of clock cycles per instruction for a program or program fragment. It is the multiplicative inverse of instructions per cycle.

== Definition ==
The average of Cycles Per Instruction in a given process (CPI) is defined by the following weighted average:

$$\mathrm{CPI} := \frac{\Sigma_i(\mathrm{IC}_i)(\mathrm{CC}_i)}{\mathrm{IC}} = \frac{\Sigma_i(\mathrm{IC}_i \cdot \mathrm{CC}_i)}{\Sigma_i(\mathrm{IC}_i)}$$

Where $\mathrm{IC}_i$ is the number of instructions for a given instruction type $i$, $\mathrm{CC}_i$ is the clock-cycles for that instruction type and $\mathrm{IC}=\Sigma_i(\mathrm{IC}_i)$ is the total instruction count. The summation sums over all instruction types for a given benchmarking process.

== Explanation ==
Let us assume a classic RISC pipeline, with the following five stages:

1. Instruction fetch cycle (IF).
2. Instruction decode/Register fetch cycle (ID).
3. Execution/Effective address cycle (EX).
4. Memory access (MEM).
5. Write-back cycle (WB).

Each stage requires one clock cycle and an instruction passes through the stages sequentially. Without pipelining, in a multi-cycle processor, a new instruction is fetched in stage 1 only after the previous instruction finishes at stage 5, therefore the number of clock cycles it takes to execute an instruction is five (CPI = 5 > 1). In this case, the processor is said to be subscalar. With pipelining, a new instruction is fetched every clock cycle by exploiting instruction-level parallelism, therefore, since one could theoretically have five instructions in the five pipeline stages at once (one instruction per stage), a different instruction would complete stage 5 in every clock cycle and on average the number of clock cycles it takes to execute an instruction is 1 (CPI = 1). In this case, the processor is said to be scalar.

With a single-execution-unit processor, the best CPI attainable is 1. However, with a multiple-execution-unit processor, one may achieve even better CPI values (CPI < 1). In this case, the processor is said to be superscalar. To get better CPI values without pipelining, the number of execution units must be greater than the number of stages. For example, with six executions units, six new instructions are fetched in stage 1 only after the six previous instructions finish at stage 5, therefore on average the number of clock cycles it takes to execute an instruction is 5/6 (CPI = 5/6 < 1). To get better CPI values with pipelining, there must be at least two execution units. For example, with two executions units, two new instructions are fetched every clock cycle by exploiting instruction-level parallelism, therefore two different instructions would complete stage 5 in every clock cycle and on average the number of clock cycles it takes to execute an instruction is 1/2 (CPI = 1/2 < 1).

== Examples ==
=== Example 1 ===
For the multi-cycle MIPS, there are five types of instructions:

- Load (5 cycles)
- Store (4 cycles)
- R-type (4 cycles)
- Branch (3 cycles)
- Jump (3 cycles)

If a program has:

- 50% load instructions
- 25% store instructions
- 15% R-type instructions
- 8% branch instructions
- 2% jump instructions

then, the CPI is:

$\text{CPI} = \frac{5 \times 50 + 4 \times 25 + 4 \times 15 + 3 \times 8 + 3 \times 2}{100} = 4.4$

=== Example 2 ===
A 400MHz processor was used to execute a benchmark program with the following instruction mix and clock cycle count:

Instruction TYPE	Instruction count	Clock cycle count
Integer Arithmetic	45000	1
Data transfer	32000	2
Floating point	15000	2
Control transfer	8000	2

Determine the effective CPI, MIPS (Millions of instructions per second) rate, and execution time for this program.

$\text{CPI} = \frac{45000 \times 1 + 32000 \times 2 + 15000 \times 2 + 8000 \times 2}{100000} = \frac{155000}{100000} = 1.55$

$400\,\text{MHz} = 400 ,000 ,000\,\text{Hz}$

since: $\text{MIPS} \propto 1/\text{CPI}$ and $\text{MIPS} \propto \text{clock frequency}$

$\text{Effective processor performance} = \text{MIPS} = \frac{\text{clock frequency}}{\text{CPI}} \times {\frac{1}{\text{1 Million}}}$$= \frac{400,000,000 }{1.55 \times 1000000}= \frac{400}{1.55} = 258 \, \text{MIPS}$

Therefore:

$\text{Execution time}(T) = \text{CPI} \times \text{Instruction count} \times \text{clock time} = \frac{\text{CPI} \times \text{Instruction Count}}{\text{frequency}}$$= \frac{1.55 \times 100000}{400 \times 1000000} = \frac{1.55}{4000} = 0.0003875 \, \text{sec} = 0.3875 \, \text{ms}$

== See also ==
- Cycle per second (Hz)
- Instructions per cycle (IPC)
- Instructions per second (IPS)
- Megahertz myth
- MIPS
- The benchmark article provides a useful introduction to computer performance measurement for those readers interested in the topic.
