= WPrime =

WPrime is a computer program that calculates a set number of square roots using Newton's method for estimating functions verifying the results by squaring them then comparing them with the original numbers.

== Significance ==
WPrime is popular in the overclocking community for testing the performance and stability of computer processors, as Super PI is single-threaded. Its popularity stemmed from being able to utilize 100% of a multi-core processor's computing time enabling its use as a multi-threaded benchmark application in competitions, computing reviews, and marketing campaigns.

WPrime’s multi-threaded design contrasts with Super PI’s single-threaded approach, providing a more comprehensive assessment of modern CPUs' parallel processing capabilities. It has been widely adopted in hardware reviews and enthusiast benchmarking due to this advantage.

== Criticism ==
The use of Newton's method for testing stability is inherently unreliable due to the self-correcting nature of the algorithm with subsequent iterations correcting any potential errors. WPrime would theoretically only detect instability from several consecutive errors. Additionally some have argued that the multi-threading algorithm used is not indicative of real world performance though much of this was due to poor implementations of multi-threading in consumer applications the early days of multi-core processors.
