= Ideas International =

Ideas International (Gartner)
- Type: Wholly owned by Gartner, Inc.
- Industry: IT Research
- Founded: 1981
- Defunct: 2012-08-01
- Fate: Acquired by Gartner
- Headquarters: Hornsby, New South Wales; Australia
- Key people: Stephen Bowhill, CEO
- Products: Competitive Profiles; ServerCAR; IDEAS Advantage; CloudSizer; RPE2
- Parent: Gartner

Founded in 1981, Ideas International (IDEAS) was an IT analyst company specializing in technology insight and comparisons of competitive server and storage technology. Acquired by Gartner in June 2012. Clients included IT end-users and IT vendors. IDEAS was the creator of RPE2, a computer benchmark that compares the relative performance of servers.

In 1986, IDEAS began distributing information about IT products in a printed volume called Competitive Profiles, which contained different pages (profiles) for each product. IDEAS began trading as a public company on the Australian Stock Exchange in 2001. In 2004, IDEAS acquired D.H. Brown Associates, a research company based in the United States focused on in-depth analysis of computing technologies. In 2009, the Australian Information Industry Association named IDEAS as the New South Wales winner of its iAward under the category Sustainability and Green IT. The following year in 2010 IDEAS won the New South Wales ICT Exporter of the Year iAward.

IDEAS was an associate member of the Transaction Processing Performance Council and a member of Standard Performance Evaluation Corporation.

On 1 August 2012, Gartner acquired Ideas International.
