= SuperPrime =

SuperPrime is a computer program used for calculating the primality of a large set of positive natural numbers. Because of its multi-threaded nature and dynamic load scheduling, it scales excellently when using more than one thread (execution core). It is commonly used as an overclocking benchmark to test the speed and stability of a system.

== Background information ==
In August 1995, the calculation of Pi up to 4,294,960,000 decimal digits was achieved by using a supercomputer at the University of Tokyo. The program used to achieve this was ported to personal computers, for operating systems such as Windows NT and Windows 95 and called Super-PI. SuperPrime is another take on this procedure, substituting raw floating-point calculations for the value of Pi with more complex instructions to calculate the primality of a set of natural numbers.

== Landmarks ==
On September 29, 2006, a milestone was broken when bachus_anonym of www.xtremesystems.org broke the 30 seconds barrier using a highly overclocked Core 2 Duo machine

== See also ==
Erodov.com, the 'home forum' for the SuperPrime benchmark.
