= Processor architecture =

Processor architecture may refer to:

- Instruction set architecture, also called an instruction set
- Microarchitecture
- Processor design
