= Performance Rating =

Figure of merit developed by AMD, Cyrix, IBM Microelectronics and SGS-Thomson

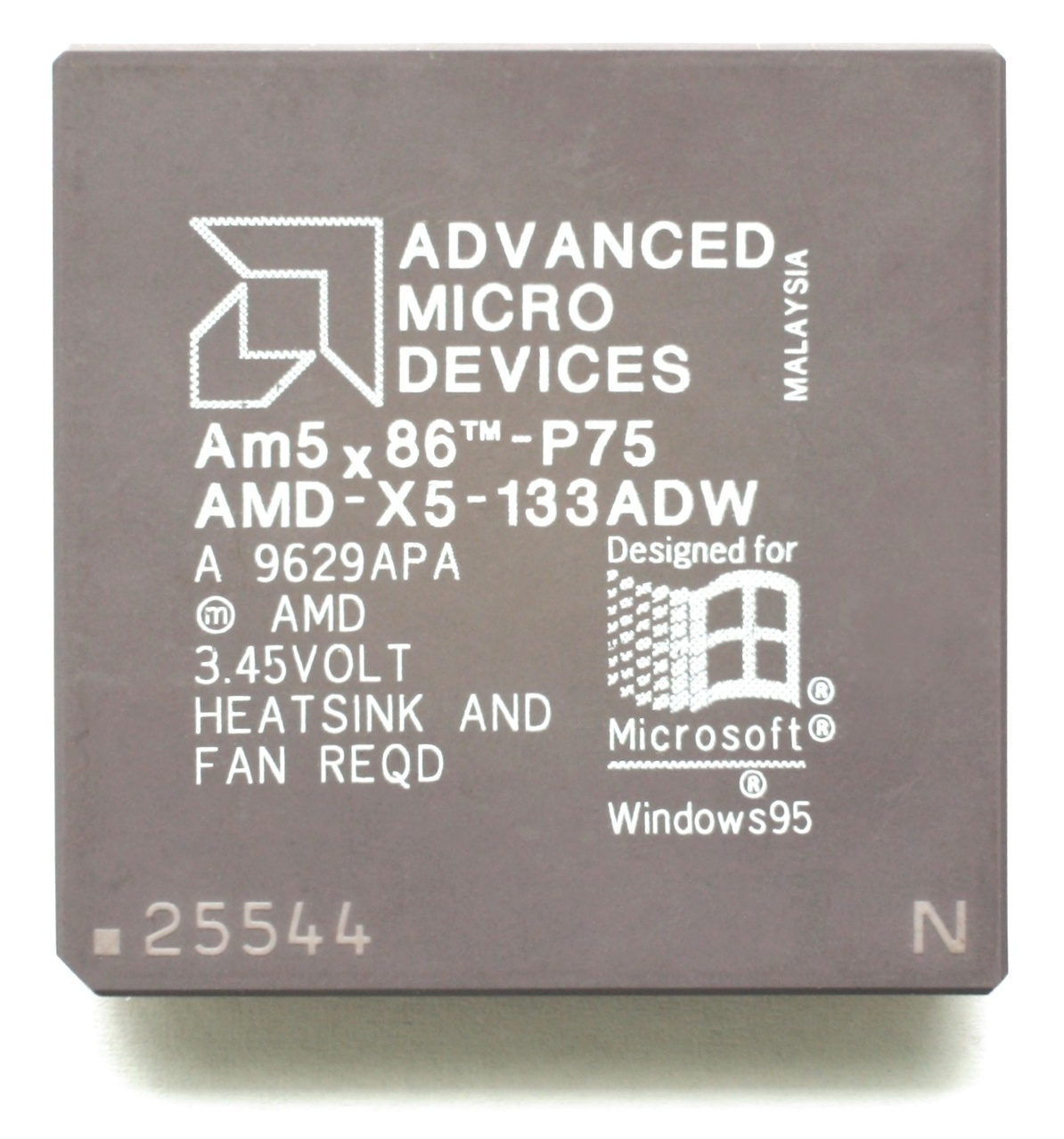
AMD 5x86 (X5) CPU

The PR (performance rating, P-rating, or Pentium rating) system was a figure of merit developed by AMD, Cyrix, IBM Microelectronics and SGS-Thomson in the mid-1990s as a method of comparing their x86 processors to those of rival Intel. The idea was to consider instructions per cycle (IPC) in addition to the clock speed, so that the processors become comparable with Intel's Pentium that had a higher clock speed with overall lower IPC.

== Branding ==
The first use of the PR system was in 1995, when AMD used it to assert that their AMD 5x86 processor was as fast as a Pentium running at 75 MHz. The designation "P75" was added to the chip to denote this. Later that year, Cyrix also adopted the PR system for its 6x86 and 6x86MX line of processors. These processors were faster than Pentiums of the same speed in some benchmarks, so Cyrix gave them a Performance Rating faster than their clock speed. Some AMD K5 models also use the PR system.

AMD initially branded its AMD K6 processors with a "PR2" rating but dropped this after consumer confusion. AMD revived the branding for its Athlon XP, which was released in 2001. The efficient Athlon XP chips could perform better than similarly-clocked chips from Intel's competing Pentium 4 line-up, which depended on high clock speeds to overcome their low IPC. As a result, AMD believed consumers would be swayed by the megahertz myth. These chips were rated against the Athlon Thunderbird but were popularly compared to the Pentium 4. As a result, the branding became colloquially known as a "Pentium Rating". Maximum PC criticized this as making it more difficult for power users to differentiate between the various Athlon XP chips. For example, two chips could be given the same "PR" branding but have much different engineering (cache size, bus speed, etc), which would affect their performance at different tasks.

== See also ==
- iCOMP (index)
