= Novabench =

Type of computer benchmarking utility

- Developer(s): Novawave Inc.
- Initial release: 2007
- Stable release: 4.0.9
- Operating system: Windows, macOS, Linux
- Platform: x64
- Available in: English
- License: Freemium
- Website: novabench.com

Novabench is a computer benchmarking utility for Microsoft Windows, macOS, and Linux. The program tests the performance of computer components and assigns proprietary scores, with higher scores indicating better performance. An online repository is available where submitted scores can be compared. A user can create an account to keep all of their submitted scores in one place. The tool has been noted for its speed and simplicity.

== History ==
Microsoft Windows

- Version 1.0 of Novabench for Windows was released in February 2007.
- Version 2.0 of Novabench for Windows was released in February 2008.
- Version 3.0 of Novabench for Windows was released in May 2010.
- Version 4.0 of Novabench for Windows was released in August 2017.

MacOS

- Version 1.0 of Novabench for MacOS was released in January 2011.
- Version 4.0 of Novabench for MacOS was released in August 2017.

Linux

- Version 4.0 of Novabench for Linux was released in October 2018.

== Limitations ==
Novabench does not take advantage of AMD CrossFireX or SLI during graphics testing on Windows, although dual-GPU testing does work on Mac. It also does not test secondary, 3rd, 4th, etc. hard drives; it only tests the system (primary) drive. Windows XP and below are no longer supported with version 3.0.4, and in Novabench 4.0, only Windows 7 and up will be supported.

== See also ==
- Benchmark (computing)
