= WorldBench =

Type of Windows benchmarking tool

WorldBench is a Windows benchmark tool offered by PC World Labs since 2000. The PC World Test Center uses this same tool every month to test contenders for PC World's Top Desktop PCs and Top Notebook PCs charts. WorldBench is also used in conjunction with other tests to evaluate Top Graphics Boards, Top Hard Drives, and other product categories.

The PC World Test Center is currently on WorldBench 6, which specializes in tests for the 32 and 64-bit platforms of the Windows Operating System from Windows XP on. Ongoing beta testing for a power-consumption analysis tool that will be incorporated into the next version of WorldBench, along with several other new additions, is currently taking place in the PCWorld Lab.

WorldBench is no longer available to the public, and the test suite is now exclusively used by the PCWorld Lab in their benchmarks.

== How It Works ==
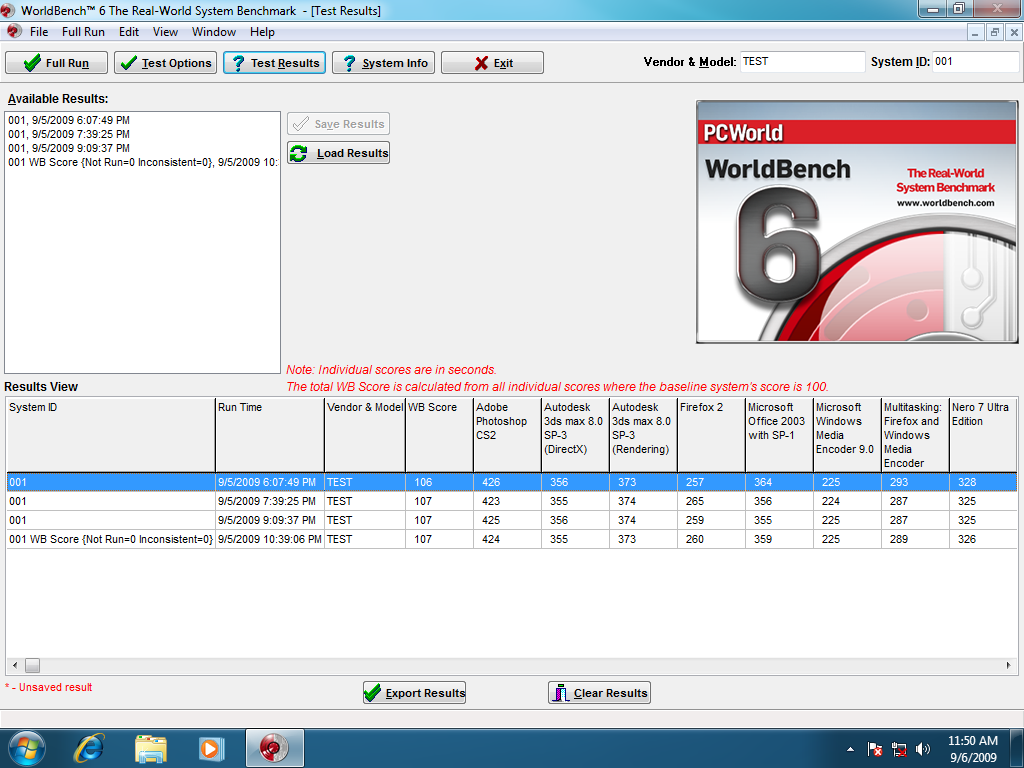
An example of a computer showing results

WorldBench uses popular desktop applications to perform realistic tasks, making it easier to accurately gauge how fast a computer runs applications routinely used, rather than just listing abstract measures of individual components. The application-based tests tell exactly what is needed—how fast the computer runs real applications. WorldBench installs special versions of each application tested, enabling the automated test scripts to perform every test. It also ensures that the software configuration and version are identical for every computer evaluated. The setup program installs the user interface, testing scripts, and all documents necessary to complete the tasks. It also unpacks and installs each application as needed during testing.

Once a test is completed, the program removes the unpacked application from the hard drive.

For security reasons, none of the test applications can be installed from the WorldBench CD.

When a test is started from WorldBench, the benchmark manager begins running the test script. This script is a series of commands—menu requests, keystrokes, and mouse clicks—that cause the application to step through typical tasks. For example, in Microsoft Office, the script starts by unpacking the version of Office embedded on the WorldBench CD. Then it opens the included test documents, copies and pastes text, changes the documents’ formatting, checks spelling, and undertakes other tasks that are likely to be performed using Office. When Office has finished all the steps in the script, the benchmark closes Office.

The following process is the testing sequence supported by each test:

- Setup system files needed by each application.
- Run system tools such as defragmenter.
- Unpack the application files and update the Registry.
- Clear idle tasks and flush file buffers
- Run the script that launches the application and performs the test.
- Restart the system.
- Remove the application files.
- Unpack the next application, and so on.

After each test, the computer is shut down and restarted to release all memory and ready the system for the next test. The computer is also restarted after the initial system setup and final clean-up processes, which prepare it for testing and restore it to its original state.

Worldbench is no longer being sold, and support for existing customers ends mid-2012.
