= NBench =

NBench, short for Native mode Benchmark and later known as BYTEmark, is a synthetic computing benchmark program developed in the mid-1990s by the now defunct BYTE magazine intended to measure a computer's CPU, FPU, and Memory System speed.

== History ==
NBench is essentially release 2 of BYTE Magazine's BYTEmark benchmark program (previously known as BYTE's Native Mode Benchmarks), published about 1995, which was just a few years before the magazine ceased publication. NBench is written in C, and was initially focused on PCs running the Microsoft Windows operating system. Independently of BYTE, in 1996 NBench was ported to Linux and other flavors of Unix by Uwe F. Mayer. More recently Ludovic Drolez prepared an NBench App for the Android mobile device operating system. NBench should not be confused with the similarly named but unrelated AMD N-Bench.

== Design ==
The NBench algorithm suite consists of ten different tasks:

- Numeric sort - Sorts an array of long integers.
- String sort - Sorts an array of strings of arbitrary length.
- Bitfield - Executes a variety of bit manipulation functions.
- Emulated floating-point - A small software floating-point package.
- Fourier coefficients - A numerical analysis routine for calculating series approximations of waveforms.
- Assignment algorithm - A well-known task allocation algorithm.
- Huffman compression - A well-known text and graphics compression algorithm.
- IDEA encryption - A relatively new block cipher algorithm.
- Neural Net - A small but functional back-propagation network simulator.
- LU Decomposition - A robust algorithm for solving linear equations.

A run of the benchmark suite consists essentially of two phases for each of the tests. First, a calibration loop is run to determine the size of the problem the system can handle in a reasonable time, in order to adapt to the ever-faster computer hardware available. Second, the actual test is run repeatedly several times to obtain a statistically meaningful result.

Originally, NBench and BYTEmark produced two overall index figures: Integer index and Floating-point index. The Integer index is the geometric mean of those tests that involve only integer processing—numeric sort, string sort, bitfield, emulated floating-point, assignment, Huffman, and IDEA—while the Floating-point index is the geometric mean of those tests that require the floating-point coprocessor—Fourier, neural net, and LU decomposition. The index figures where relative scores to get a general feel for the performance of the machine under test as compared to a baseline system based on a 90 MHz Pentium Intel CPU.

The Linux/Unix port has a second baseline machine, it is an AMD K6/233 with 32 MB RAM and 512 KB L2-cache running Linux 2.0.32 and using GNU gcc version 2.7.2.3 and libc-5.4.38. The original integer index was split into an integer-operation and a memory-operation index, as suggested by Andrew D. Balsa, reflecting the realization that memory management is important in CPU design. The original tests have been left alone, however, the geometric mean of the tests numeric sort, floating-point emulation, IDEA, and Huffman now constitutes the integer-arithmetic focused benchmark index, while the geometric mean of the tests string sort, bitfield, and assignment makes up the new memory index. The floating point index has been left alone, it is still the geometric mean of fourier, neural net, and LU decomposition.

== Use ==
The benchmark suite has seen consistent use since the mid-1990s by the personal computing community, on PCs and other devices running various flavors of UNIX including Linux or BSD, or running Windows (usually in combination with Cygwin), and on also on Macs (it is in particular available as a Darwin port). A results page from runs on many different hardware configurations, from high-powered multi-CPU servers down to low-powered network switches, is maintained by the original porter.

== Shortcomings ==
Using NBench as a benchmark has pitfalls:

- These benchmarks are meant to expose the theoretical upper limit of the CPU, FPU, and memory architecture of a system. They cannot measure video, disk, or network throughput (those are the domains of a different set of benchmarks).
- NBench is single-threaded. Currently, each benchmark test uses only a single execution thread. However, most modern operating systems have some multitasking component. How a system "scales" as more tasks are run simultaneously is an effect that NBench does not explore.

== See also ==
- Benchmark (computing)
- Whetstone (benchmark)
- Dhrystone
