= Libquantum =

Quantum mechanics simulator

Libquantum is a C library quantum mechanics simulator originally focused on virtual quantum computers. It is licensed under the GNU GPL. It was a part of SPEC 2006. The latest version is stated to be v1.1.1 (Jan 2013) on the mailing list, but on the website there is only v0.9.1 from 2007.

An author of libquantum, Hendrik Weimer, has published a paper in Nature about using Rydberg atoms for universal quantum simulation with colleagues, using his own work.
