= TATP Benchmark =

Performance measure used in computing

In transaction processing, the Telecommunication Application Transaction Processing Benchmark (TATP) is a benchmark designed to measure the performance of in-memory database transaction systems.

== Benchmark ==
As database and microprocessor architectures change, so must the benchmarks that are employed to measure the combined performance of these critical components. While other industry standard throughput workloads already exist, none was designed specifically to exercise the relationship between in-memory database software and the memory processing subsystem in which it transacts. The TATP is a new open source workload designed specifically for high-throughout applications, well suited for in-memory database performance analysis and system comparison.

The TATP benchmark simulates a typical home location register (HLR) database used by a mobile carrier. The HLR is an application mobile network operators use to store all relevant information about valid subscribers, including the mobile phone number, the services to which they have subscribed, access privileges, and the current location of the subscriber's handset. Every call to and from a mobile phone involves lookups against the HLRs of both parties, making it is a perfect example of a demanding, high-throughput environment where the workloads are pertinent to all applications requiring extreme speed: telecommunications, financial services, gaming, event processing and alerting, reservation systems, software as a service (SaaS), and so on.

The benchmark generates a flooding load on a database server. This means that the load is generated up to the maximum throughput point that the server can sustain. The load is generated by issuing pre-defined transactions run against a specified target database. The target database schema is made to resemble a typical HLR database in a mobile phone network. The algorithm of what is known as the TATP Benchmark was originally published in a Master's Thesis. The benchmark was modeled after a real test program that was used by a telecom equipment manufacturer to evaluate the applicability of various relational database systems to service control programming in mobile networks. Another derivative of the original test is the Network Database Benchmark. TATP executes seven pre-defined transactions that insert, update, delete and query the data in the database. The TATP results show the Mean Qualified Throughput (MQTh) of the target database system, and the response time distributions per transaction type for all seven types of transactions.

The TATP benchmark has been used in industry and research.
