= Livermore loops =

Type of benchmark for parallel computers

Livermore loops (also known as the Livermore Fortran kernels or LFK) is a benchmark for parallel computers. It was created by Francis H. McMahon from scientific source code run on computers at Lawrence Livermore National Laboratory. It consists of 24 do loops, some of which can be vectorized, and some of which cannot.

The benchmark was published in 1986 in Livermore fortran kernels: A computer test of numerical performance range.

The Livermore loops were originally written in Fortran, but have since been ported to many programming languages.

Each loop carries out a different mathematical kernel. Those kernels are:

- hydrodynamics fragment
- incomplete Cholesky conjugate gradient
- inner product
- banded linear systems solution
- tridiagonal linear systems solution
- general linear recurrence equations
- equation of state fragment
- alternating direction implicit integration
- integrate predictors
- difference predictors
- first sum
- first difference
- 2-D particle in a cell
- 1-D particle in a cell
- casual Fortran
- Monte Carlo search
- implicit conditional computation
- 2-D explicit hydrodynamics fragment
- general linear recurrence equations
- discrete ordinates transport
- matrix-matrix transport
- Planckian distribution
- 2-D implicit hydrodynamics fragment
- location of a first array minimum.
