= AIM Multiuser Benchmark =

Computer benchmark

The AIM Multiuser Benchmark, also called the AIM Benchmark Suite VII or AIM7, is a job throughput benchmark widely used by UNIX computer system vendors. Current research operating systems such as K42 use the reaim form of the benchmark for performance analysis. The AIM7 benchmark measures some of the same things as the SDET benchmark.

The original code was developed by Gene Dronek for AIM Technology, Inc., who licensed it to others. The first AIM Benchmarks were for single user PCs. The suite was expanded and enhanced to become multi-user benchmarks by Donald Steiny. Caldera International, Inc., bought the license and released the source code for Suite VII and Suite IX under the GPL.

AIM7 is a program written in C that forks many processes called tasks, each of which concurrently runs in random order a set of subtests called jobs. There are 53 kinds of jobs, each of which exercises a different aspect of the operating system, such as disk-file operations, process creation, user virtual memory operations, pipe I/O, and compute-bound arithmetic loops.

An AIM7 benchmark run is composed of a sequence of subruns with the number of tasks incrementing by one between each subrun. Each subrun goes until each of its tasks has completed its set of jobs. Each subrun reports a metric of jobs completed per minute, with the final report for the overall benchmark being a table of that throughput metric versus number of tasks. A given system will have a peak number of tasks N at which the jobs per minute is maximized. Either N or the value of the jobs per minute at N is typically used as the metric of interest.
