= SPECint =

Computer benchmark specification for CPU integer processing power

SPEC INT is a computer benchmark specification for CPU integer processing power. It is maintained by the Standard Performance Evaluation Corporation (SPEC). SPEC INT is the integer performance testing component of the SPEC test suite. The first SPEC test suite, CPU92, was announced in 1992. It was followed by CPU95, CPU2000, and CPU2006.

The latest standard is SPEC CPU 2017 and consists of SPEC speed and SPEC rate (aka SPECCPU_2017).

== SPEC INT 2006 ==
CPU2006 is a set of benchmarks designed to test the CPU performance of a modern server computer system. It is split into two components, the first being CINT2006, the other being CFP2006 (SPECfp), for floating point testing.

SPEC defines a base runtime for each of the 12 benchmark programs. For SPECint2006, that number ranges from 1000 to 3000 seconds. The timed test is run on the system, and the time of the test system is compared to the reference time, and a ratio is computed. That ratio becomes the SPEC INT score for that test. (This differs from the rating in SPECINT2000, which multiplies the ratio by 100.)

As an example for SPECint2006, consider a processor which can run 400.perlbench in 2000 seconds. The time it takes the reference machine to run the benchmark is 9770 seconds. Thus the ratio is 4.885. Each ratio is computed, and then the geometric mean of those ratios is computed to produce an overall value.

== Background ==
For a fee, SPEC distributes source code files to users wanting to test their systems. These files are written in a standard programming language, which is then compiled for each particular CPU architecture and operating system. Thus, the performance measured is that of the CPU, RAM, and compiler, and does not test I/O, networking, or graphics.

Two metrics are reported for a particular benchmark, "base" and "peak". Compiler options account for the difference between the two numbers. As the SPEC benchmarks are distributed as source code, it is up to the party performing the test to compile this code. There is agreement that the benchmarks should be compiled in the same way as a user would compile a program, but there is no consistent method for user compilation, it varies system by system. SPEC, in this case, defines two reference points, "base" and "peak". Base has a more strict set of compilation rules than peak. Less optimization can be done, the compiler flags must be the same for each benchmark, in the same order, and there must be a limited number of flags. Base, then, is closest to how a user would compile a program with standard flags. The 'peak' metric can be performed with maximum compiler optimization, even to the extent of different optimizations for each benchmark. This number represents maximum system performance, achieved by full compiler optimization.

SPEC INT tests are carried out on a wide range of hardware, with results typically published for the full range of system-level implementations employing the latest CPUs. For SPECint2006, the CPUs include Intel and AMD x86 & x86-64 processors, Sun SPARC CPUs, IBM Power CPUs, and IA-64 CPUs. This range of capabilities, specifically in this case the number of CPUs, means that the SPEC INT benchmark is usually run on only a single CPU, even if the system has many CPUs. If a single CPU has multiple cores, only a single core is used; hyper-threading is also typically disabled,

A more complete system-level benchmark that allows all CPUs to be used is known as SPECint_rate2006, also called "CINT2006 Rate".

== Benchmarks ==
The SPECint2006 test suite consists of 12 benchmark programs, designed to test exclusively the integer performance of the system.

The benchmarks are:

Benchmark	Language	Category	Description
400.perlbench	C	Perl Programming Language	Derived from Perl V5.8.7. The workload includes SpamAssassin, MHonArc (an email indexer), and specdiff (SPEC's tool that checks benchmark outputs).
401.bzip2	C	Compression	Julian Seward's bzip2 version 1.0.3, modified to do most work in memory, rather than doing I/O.
403.gcc	C	C Compiler	Based on gcc Version 3.2, generates code for Opteron.
429.mcf	C	Combinatorial Optimization	Vehicle scheduling. Uses a network simplex algorithm (which is also used in commercial products) to schedule public transport.
445.gobmk	C	Artificial Intelligence: go playing	Plays the game of Go, a simply described but deeply complex game.
456.hmmer	C	Search Gene Sequence	Protein sequence analysis using profile hidden Markov models (profile HMMs)
458.sjeng	C	Artificial Intelligence: chess playing	A highly-ranked chess program that also plays several chess variants.
462.libquantum	C	Physics: Quantum Computing	Simulates a quantum computer, running Shor's polynomial-time factorization algorithm.
464.h264ref	C	Video Compression	A reference implementation of H.264/AVC, encodes a videostream using 2 parameter sets. The H.264/AVC standard is expected to replace MPEG2
471.omnetpp	C++	Discrete Event Simulation	Uses the OMNet++ discrete event simulator to model a large Ethernet campus network.
473.astar	C++	Path-finding Algorithms	Pathfinding library for 2D maps, including the well known A* algorithm.
483.xalancbmk	C++	XML Processing	A modified version of Xalan-C++, which transforms XML documents to other document types.

== See also ==
- N Bench
- Dhrystone
- Instructions per second
