= UserBenchmark =

Computer benchmark program and website

- Website type: Computer hardware ranking charts
- Products: Computer benchmarking tool
- Website: www.userbenchmark.com

UserBenchmark is a computer benchmarking website that provides users with performance scores for various hardware components. It offers user-submitted reviews and dedicated tools to evaluate and compare the performance of individual components based on system tests. Its controversial opinions and perceived biases in its computer hardware rankings against AMD products have drawn criticism in the tech press.

== Features ==
UserBenchmark is a website which offers a benchmarking program to run on the user's PC and then allows them to upload the results on the website. The website provides performance comparisons for CPUs, GPUs, SSDs, HDDs, RAM, and USB drives. It works on a similar concept to 3DMark, another system benchmarking tool.

As UserBenchmark allows users to upload their hardware score results to the website, it makes it a source of unreleased hardware leaks. Leaks have been discovered for AMD, Intel and NVIDIA hardware.

In 2024, UserBenchmark required a $10 per year fee to allow usage of the program during periods of high use. Some people, without subscriptions, may be able to make use of free open testing slots. To test with the open free slots, non-subscribers must finish "a 3D captcha minigame" with the objective of shooting 13 ships to the ground.

== Controversies ==
In July 2019, UserBenchmark updated how it calculates the effective speed index on its website's CPU hardware rankings, drastically affecting the ranking positions of CPUs, which had the effect of penalizing high core count processors, including most of AMD's lineup. This resulted in backlash on social media, with some hardware enthusiast boards banning links to the UserBenchmark website. UserBenchmark has become well known in the enthusiast PC gaming community for benchmarks results that disagree sharply with other sources.
