= EEMBC =

Organization of creation of standard benchmarks

EEMBC, the Embedded Microprocessor Benchmark Consortium, was a non-profit, member-funded organization formed in 1997, focused on the creation of standard benchmarks for the hardware and software used in embedded systems. The goal of its members is to make EEMBC benchmarks an industry standard for evaluating the capabilities of embedded processors, compilers, and the associated embedded system implementations, according to objective, clearly defined, application-based criteria. EEMBC members may contribute to the development of benchmarks, vote at various stages before public distribution, and accelerate testing of their platforms through early access to benchmarks and associated specifications.

In 2023 the Embedded Microprocessor Benchmark Consortium merged with Standard Performance Evaluation Corporation (SPEC) becoming the SPEC Embedded Group.

== Most Popular Benchmark Working Groups ==
In chronological order of development:

AutoBench 1.1 - single-threaded code for automotive, industrial, and general-purpose applications

Networking - single-threaded code associated with moving packets in networking applications.

MultiBench - multi-threaded code for testing scalability of multicore processors.

CoreMark - measures the performance of central processing units (CPU) used in embedded systems

BXBench - system benchmark measuring the web browsing user-experience, from the click/touch on a URL to final page rendered on the screen, and is not limited to measuring only JavaScript execution.

AndEBench-Pro - system benchmark providing a standardized, industry-accepted method of evaluating Android platform performance. It's available for free download in Google Play.

FPMark - multi-threaded code for both single- and double-precision floating-point workloads, as well as small, medium, and large data sets.

ULPMark - energy-measuring benchmark for ultra-low power microcontrollers; benchmarks include ULPMark-Core (with a focus on microcontroller core activity and sleep modes) and ULPMark-Peripheral (with a focus on microcontroller peripheral activity such as Analog-to-digital converter, Serial Peripheral Interface Bus, Real-time clock, and Pulse-width modulation)

IoTConnect - system-level benchmark measuring performance and energy associated with connecting Internet of Things devices; the first phase, called IoTMark-BLE, focuses on Bluetooth

ADASMark - focusing on compute intensive application flows which are common to embedded heterogeneous computing architectures; the first phase includes real-world workloads from automotive surround view.

SecureMark - Measures performance, energy, and memory impact allowing application developers to analyze IoT device security implementations

IoTMark-Wi-Fi - The second phase of IoTMark, which focuses on 802.11 energy efficiency.

== Name ==
Originally founded as the EDN Embedded Microprocessor Benchmark Consortium, EEMBC separated from EDN Magazine in 2012, but retained the double "E" in the name.
