= Geekbench =

Benchmarking software

- Developer: Primate Labs Inc.
- Stable release: 7.0 / 21 July 2026; 2 days ago
- Written in: C++, C, Objective-C, Python, Ruby
- Operating system: macOS, Windows, Linux, Android, iOS and iPadOS
- Platform: x86-64, ARMv7, AArch64, RISC-V64
- Available in: English
- Type: Benchmark
- License: Proprietary
- Website: www.geekbench.com

Geekbench is a proprietary and freemium cross-platform utility for benchmarking the central processing unit (CPU) and graphics processing unit (GPU) of computers, laptops, tablets, and phones.

== History ==
Geekbench began as a cross-platform benchmarking platform for Mac OS X and Windows, with support later added for Android, iOS and Linux distributions.

Geekbench 4 started measuring GPU performance in areas such as image processing and computer vision.

Geekbench 5 dropped support for IA-32, the 32-bit version of the x86 architecture.

== Usage ==
It uses a scoring system that separates single-core and multi-core performance, and workloads designed to simulate real-world scenarios. The software benchmark is available for macOS, Windows, Linux, Android and iOS. Free users are required to upload test results online in order to run the benchmark.

In 2013, the usefulness of the scores from earlier versions of Geekbench (up to version 3) was heavily disputed by Linus Torvalds in an online forum. Linus' concerns that Geekbench combined disparate benchmarks into a single score were addressed in Geekbench 4 by splitting integer, floating point, and crypto into sub-scores. Linus regarded the changes as improvements in an informal review.
