= Super PI =

Computer program

- Operating system: Windows
- Type: Benchmark
- Website: https://web.archive.org/web/20231211194233/https://www.superpi.net/

Super PI finishing a calculation of 1,048,576, or 2^{20} digits of pi

Super PI is a computer program that calculates pi to a specified number of digits after the decimal point—up to a maximum of 32 million. It uses the Gauss–Legendre algorithm and is a Windows port of the program used by Yasumasa Kanada in 1995 to compute pi to 2^{32} digits.

== Significance ==
Super PI is popular in the overclocking community, both as a benchmark to test the performance of these systems and as a stress test to check that they are still functioning correctly.

== Credibility concerns ==
The competitive nature of achieving the best Super PI calculation times led to fraudulent Super PI results, reporting calculation times faster than normal. Attempts to counter the fraudulent results resulted in a modified version of Super PI, with a checksum to validate the results. However, other methods exist of producing inaccurate or fake time results, raising questions about the program's future as an overclocking benchmark.

Super PI utilizes x87 floating point instructions which are supported on all x86 and x86-64 processors, current versions which also support the lower precision Streaming SIMD Extensions vector instructions.
