= Standard Performance Evaluation Corporation =

American non-profit corporation

- Formation: 1988
- Type: Non-profit corporation
- Headquarters: Gainesville, Virginia
- Members: Over 120 Hardware/Software Vendors, Universities, Research Centers
- Website: www.spec.org

The Standard Performance Evaluation Corporation (SPEC) is a non-profit consortium that establishes and maintains standardized benchmarks and performance evaluation tools for new generations of computing systems. SPEC was founded in 1988 and its membership comprises over 120 computer hardware and software vendors, educational institutions, research organizations, and government agencies internationally.

SPEC benchmarks and tools are widely used to evaluate the performance of computer systems; the test results are published on the SPEC website.

== History ==
The SPEC organization has its origins in efforts by prominent workstation and high-performance computing vendors Apollo Computer, Hewlett-Packard, MIPS Computer Systems and Sun Microsystems to more accurately characterise the performance of computer systems, particularly those based on RISC architectures. Since workstations and servers had begun to incorporate architectural features previously employed in mainframe and supercomputer designs, existing benchmarks such as Dhrystone and Whetstone were considered inadequate. In May 1989, with its membership expanded to ten companies including Digital Equipment Corporation and IBM, the consortium announced the first version of its benchmark suite, running on Unix and consisting of 20 benchmarks.

Despite deprecating the established VAX MIPS or VAX Unit of Performance metric, the initial SPEC benchmarks retained Digital's VAX 11/780 as its reference, having a SPECmark of 1. This SPECmark metric, a feature of the SPEC89 suite, was the geometric mean of two separate results, SPECint89 for integer-based benchmarks and SPECfp89 for benchmarks emphasising floating-point arithmetic, but a single figure was later deemed to be inadequate at representing the general performance of a given system.
