= ENBau =

Swiss initiative promoting sustainable building practices

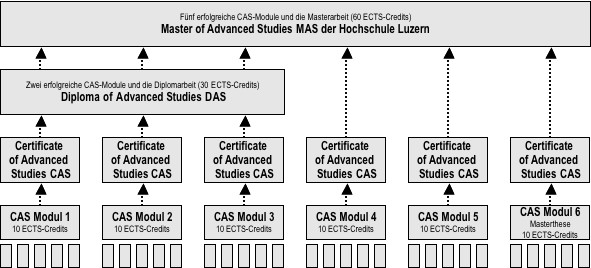
Scheme Master of Advanced Studies MAS ENBau

ENBau is an initiative of Swiss universities for training in sustainable building with the goal of resource efficiency of buildings in the areas of energy, water, materials and processes.

It is the goal of the participation of the Swiss Confederation to the sustainability of this initiative design skills in planning, construction and operation of real estate to promote and reinforce the building as a system is implemented. "ENBau" is the abbreviation for energy and sustainability in construction.

== Organisation ==
The initiative was founded in 2007 from the University Lucerne (HSLU) together with the Berne University of Applied Sciences, University of Applied Sciences Northwestern Switzerland (FHNW), Zurich University of Applied Sciences (ZHAW) and the University of Applied Sciences Chur (HTW Chur). Participation is also given from the Conference of Cantonal Energy Directors Switzerland (EnDK) and the Swiss Federal Office of Energy (BFE) in Berne. President of the leading Cooperation Council is Prof. Peter Schürch; director of the ENBau office for sustainable construction at University Lucerne (HSLU) is Christoph Wagener Ph.D..

== Programme ==
The aim of the initiative ENBau is a broad-based education campaign at higher levels in sustainable building, energy efficiency, renewable energies and the reduction of CO_{2} emissions based on the strategy of the 2000-watt society, the Swiss commitment to the Kyoto Protocol and the vision of the Green Building.

The organization of the study-programmes will be implemented through various modules, the academic qualifications are for the individual modules the CAS-degree (Certificate of Advanced Studies) and above all a "Master of Advanced Studies (MAS) in sustainable building." The individual modules are:

- Basics for sustainable construction
- Renewable energy
- Passive solar building design
- Building physics and Structural design for sustainable construction
- Facility management
- Architectural engineering
- Business Management, Project management and Process management
- Minergie / Minergie P-building concepts
- Efficient energy use in construction
- Multidisciplinary approach (feasibility study)

== See also ==
- 2000-watt society
- One Watt Initiative
- Sustainable development
- Energy policy
- Low-energy house
- Minergie
