= Real-time clock alarm =

Computer feature

A real time clock alarm is a feature that can be used to allow a computer to 'wake up' after shutting down to execute tasks every day or on a certain day. It can sometimes be found in the power management section of a motherboard's BIOS/UEFI setup. Wake On LAN, Wake on ring, and IPMI functions could also be used to start a computer after it is turned off.

In Linux, the real time clock alarm can be set or retrieved using /proc/acpi/alarm or /sys/class/rtc/rtc0/wakealarm. Alternatively, the rtcwake utility may be used which prevents problems when using local time instead of UTC by automatically processing the /etc/adjtime file. systemd can be used to wake a system and run a task at a specific time.

In Microsoft Windows there are different programs which could be used to 'wake up' a computer from standby or hibernation. Task Scheduler settings for power management can be used to 'Wake the computer to run this task'.

== See also ==
- Alert on LAN
- Wake-on-Ring (WOR)
- Wired for Management
- Wake-on-LAN
