= WFM =

WFM may refer to:

== Science and technology ==
- Waveform monitor, a type of oscilloscope used to monitor analog video signals
- Wired for Management, an Intel standard for managing computer systems
- Wideband FM, a form of frequency modulated radio

== Organisations ==
- Western Federation of Miners, an American labor union
- Whole Foods Market, an American foods supermarket
- World Federalist Movement/Institute for Global Policy, a global citizens movement

== Other ==
- Wallace Fard Muhammad, founder of the Nation of Islam
- Woman FIDE Master, a title awarded by FIDE to highly rated women chess players
- Workforce management, the activities related to a company's employees
- WFM (motorcycle), defunct Polish motorcycle manufacturer
