= AC adapter =

Type of external power supply

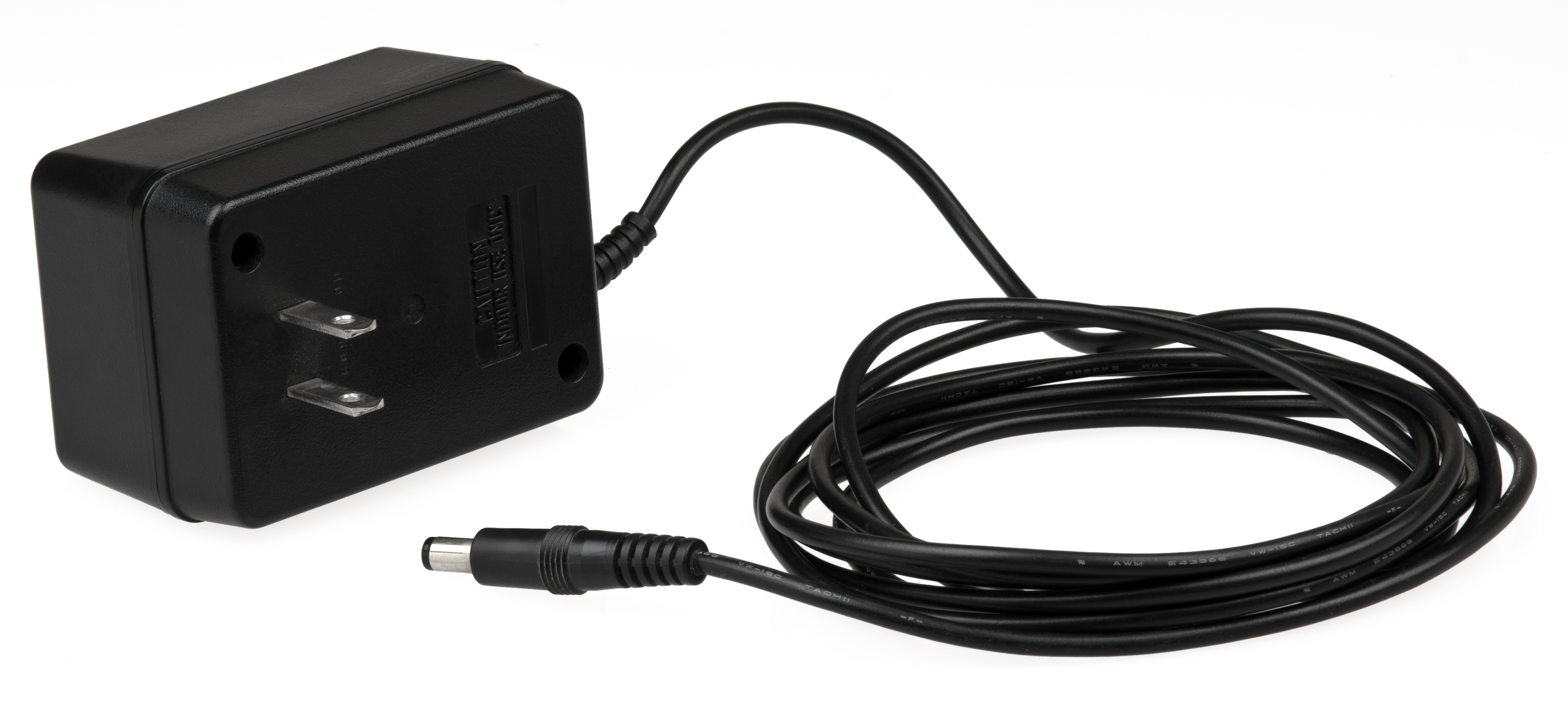
A "wall-wart" type of AC adapter for a household game console. The output has a barrel connector.

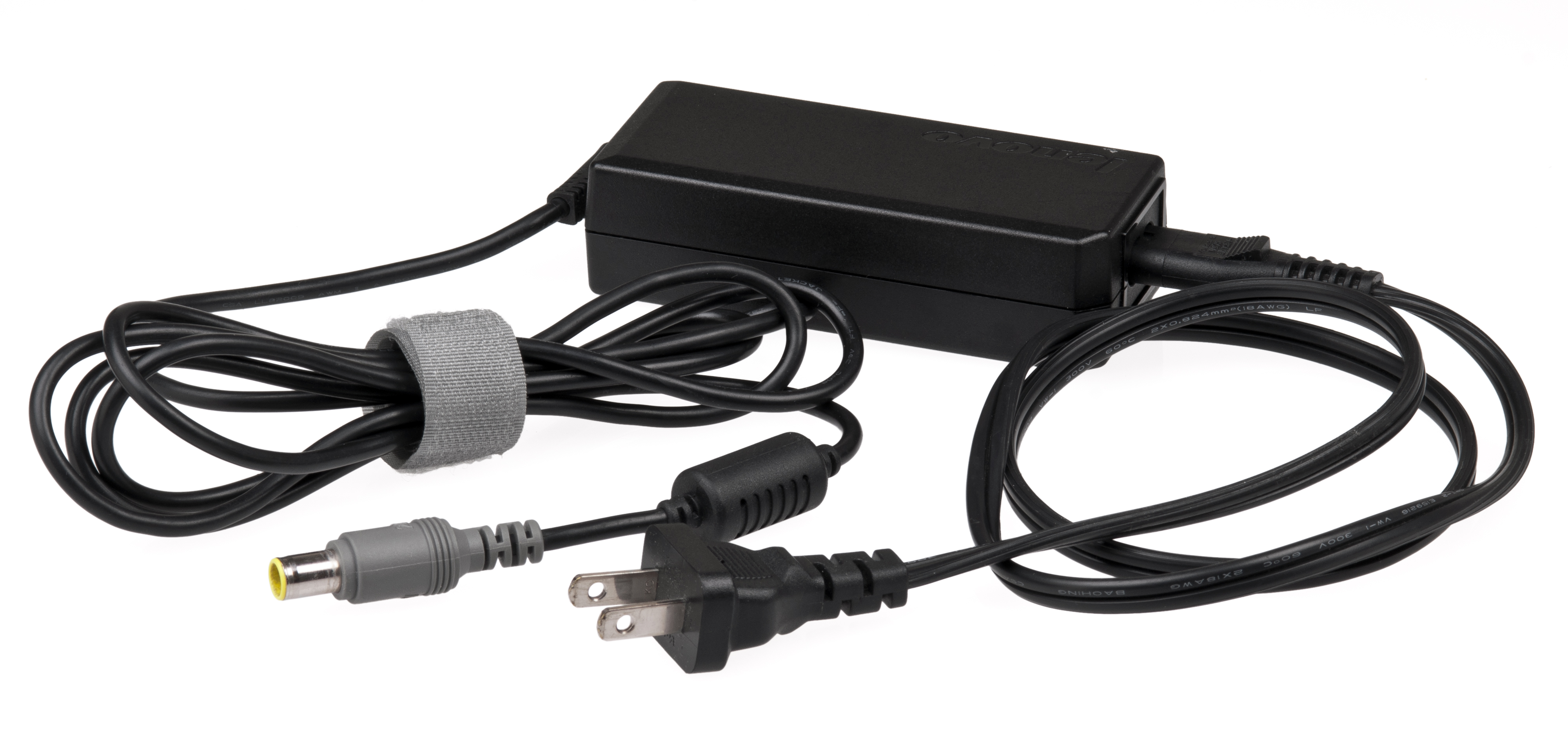
"Power brick" in-line configuration, with detachable AC cord and NEMA 1-15 plug.

An AC adapter or AC/DC adapter (also called a wall charger, power adapter, or informally wall wart, or, in some configurations, power brick) is a type of external power supply, often enclosed in a case similar to an AC plug. AC adapters deliver electric power to devices that lack internal components to draw voltage and power from mains power themselves. The internal circuitry of an external power supply is often very similar to the design that would be used for a built-in or internal supply.

When used with battery-powered equipment, adapters typically charge the battery as well as powering the equipment.

Aside from obviating the need for internal power supplies, adapters offer flexibility: a device can draw power from 120 VAC or 230 VAC mains, vehicle battery, or aircraft battery, just by using different adapters. Safety can be another advantage, as hazardous 120 or 240 volt mains power is transformed to a lower, safer voltage at the wall outlet before going into the appliance handled by the user.

== Modes of operation ==
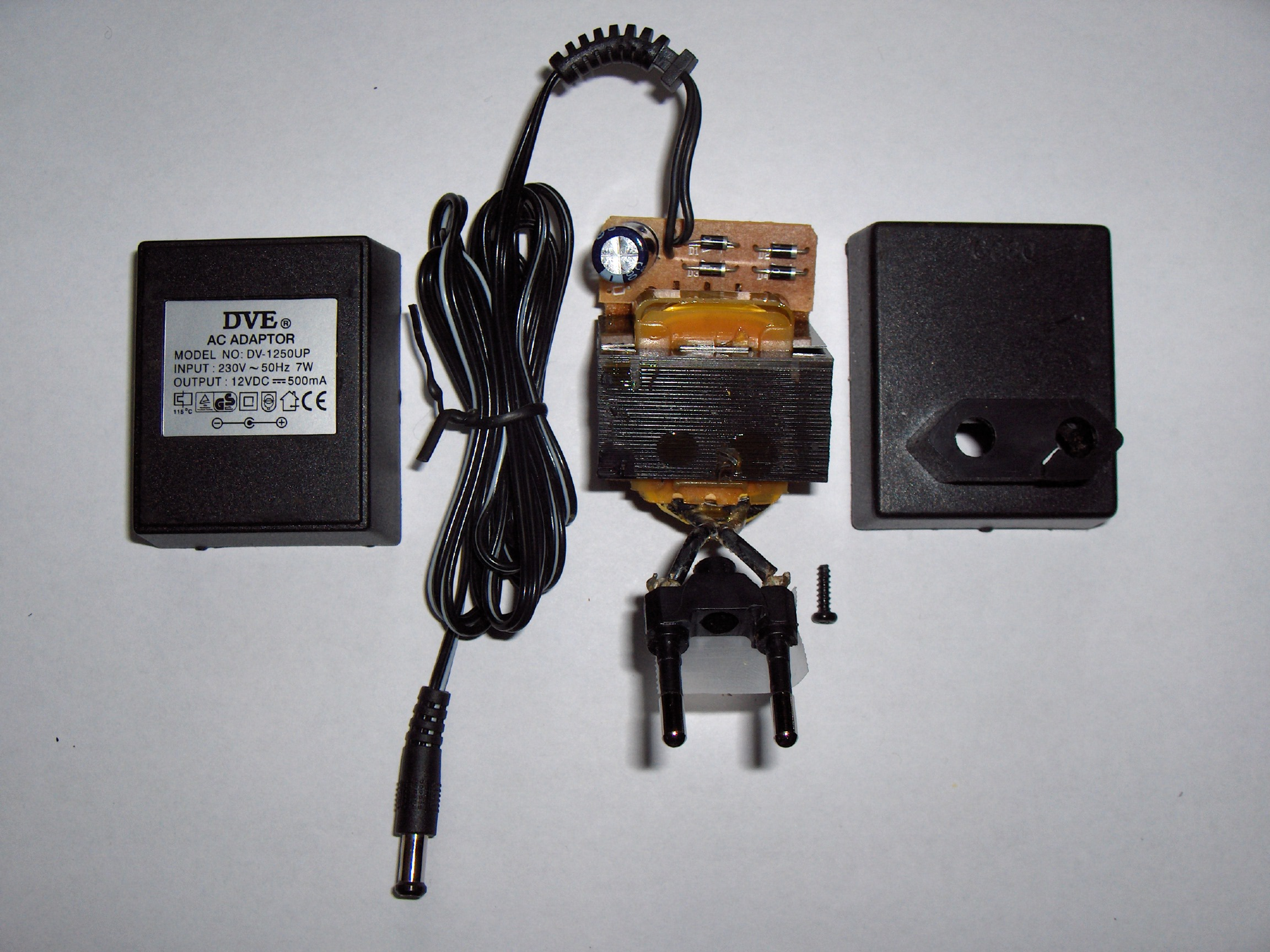
A disassembled AC adapter showing a simple, unregulated linear DC supply circuit: a transformer, four diodes in a bridge rectifier, and a single electrolytic capacitor to smooth the waveform

Originally, most AC/DC adapters were linear power supplies, containing a transformer to convert the mains electricity voltage to a lower voltage, a rectifier to convert it to pulsating DC, and a filter to smooth the pulsating waveform to DC, with residual ripple variations small enough to leave the powered device unaffected. Size and weight of the device was largely determined by the transformer, which in turn was determined by the power output and mains frequency. Ratings over a few watts made the devices too large and heavy to be physically supported by a wall outlet. The output voltage of these adapters varied with load; for equipment requiring a more stable voltage, linear voltage regulator circuitry was added. Losses in the transformer and the linear regulator were considerable; efficiency was relatively low, and significant power dissipated as heat even when not driving a load.

Early in the twenty-first century, switched-mode power supplies (SMPSs) became almost ubiquitous for this purpose due to their compact size and light weight relative to their power output ability. Mains voltage is rectified to a high direct voltage driving a switching circuit, which contains a transformer operating at a high frequency and outputs direct current at the desired voltage. The high-frequency ripple is more easily filtered out than mains-frequency. The high frequency allows the transformer to be small, which reduces its losses; and the switching regulator can be much more efficient than a linear regulator. The result is a much more efficient, smaller, and lighter device. Safety is ensured, as in the older linear circuit, because a transformer still provides galvanic isolation.

A linear circuit must be designed for a specific, narrow range of input voltages (e.g., 220–240 VAC.) and must use a transformer appropriate for the frequency (usually 50 or 60 Hz), but a switched-mode supply can work efficiently over a very wide range of voltages and frequencies; a single 100–240 VAC unit will handle almost any mains supply in the world.

Many inexpensive switched-mode AC adapters do not implement adequate filtering and/or shielding for electromagnetic interference that they generate. The nature of these high speed, high-energy switching designs is such that when these preventative measures are not implemented, relatively high energy harmonics can be generated, and radiated, well into the radio portion of the spectrum. The amount of RF energy typically decreases with frequency; so, for instance, interference in the medium wave (US AM) broadcast band in the one megahertz region may be strong, while interference with the FM broadcast band around 100 megahertz may be considerably less. Distance is a factor; the closer the interference is to a radio receiver, the more intense it will be. Even WiFi reception in the gigahertz range can be degraded if the receiving antennae are very close to a radiating AC adapter. A determination of if interference is coming from a specific AC adapter can be made simply by unplugging the suspect adapter while observing the amount of interference received in the problem radio band. In a modern household or business environment, there may be multiple AC adapters in use; in such a case, unplug them all, then plug them back in one by one until the culprit or culprits is found.

Traditionally, wall adapters provided a constant voltage. For USB-powered devices, it is 5 volts. Later, battery charging protocols such as Quick Charge by Qualcomm and USB Power Delivery started allowing charged devices to request different voltages suited for their needs, usually higher voltages to increase power without adding heat to the copper wires of the USB cable. In the past, "SuperCharge" by Huawei and "Dash Charge" by OnePlus did the opposite, requesting a slightly lowered voltage to directly match the battery voltage inside the smartphone so no change of voltage has to take place inside the phone, leading to less heating up. This required special USB cables with thicker copper wires.

In the early 2020s, the use of gallium nitride instead of silicon in switching wall adapters bumped up their output power at the same physical size, making compact wall warts able to power even some laptops, not only smartphones and tablet computers. The creation of Gallium Nitride chargers was delayed owing to their excessive costs and that fast charging technology was less in demand than it has become after 2020.

== Advantages ==
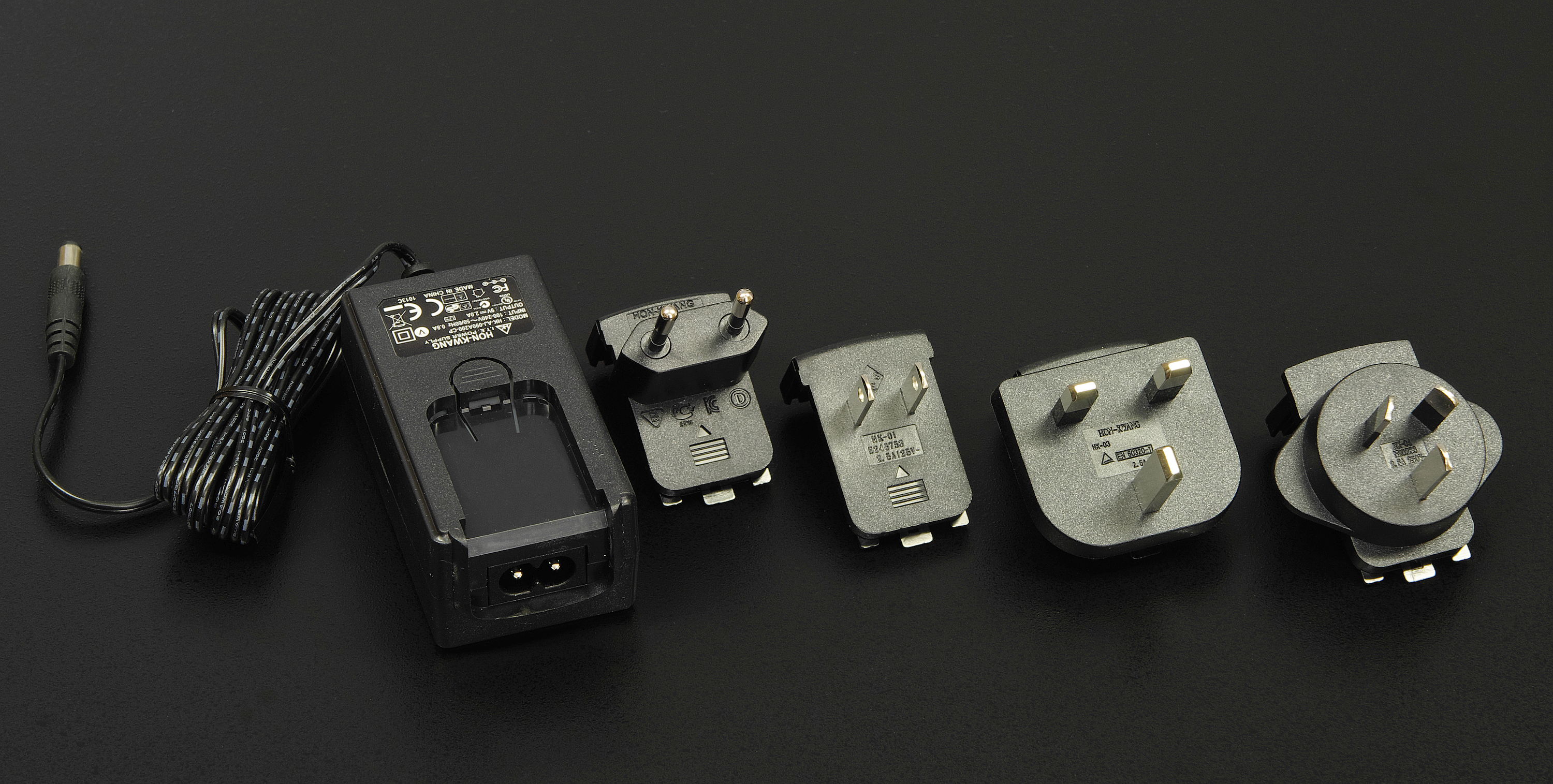
AC adapter supporting four different AC plug systems

External AC adapters are widely used to power small or portable electronic devices. The advantages include:

- Safety – External power adapters can free product designers from worrying about some safety issues. Much of this style of equipment uses only voltages low enough not to be a safety hazard internally, although the power supply must out of necessity use dangerous mains voltage. If an external power supply is used (usually via a power connector, often of coaxial type), the equipment need not be designed with concern for hazardous voltages inside the enclosure. This is particularly relevant for equipment with lightweight cases which may break and expose internal electrical parts.
- Heat reduction – Heat reduces reliability and longevity of electronic components, and can cause sensitive circuits to become inaccurate or malfunction. A separate power supply removes a source of heat from the apparatus.
- Electrical noise reduction – Because radiated electrical noise falls off with the square of the distance, it is to the manufacturer's advantage to convert potentially noisy AC line power or automotive power to "clean", filtered DC in an external adapter, at a safe distance from noise-sensitive circuitry.
- Weight and size reduction – Removing power components and the mains connection plug from equipment powered by rechargeable batteries reduces the weight and size which must be carried.
- Ease of replacement – Power supplies are more prone to failure than other circuitry due to their exposure to power spikes and their internal generation of waste heat. External power supplies can be replaced quickly by a user without the need to have the powered device repaired.
- Configuration versatility – Externally powered electronic products can be used with different power sources as needed (e.g. 120 VAC, 240 VAC, 12 VDC, or external battery pack), for convenient use in the field, or when traveling.
- Simplified product inventory, distribution, and certification – An electronic product that is sold and used internationally must be powered from a wide range of power sources, and must meet product safety regulations in many jurisdictions, usually requiring expensive certification by national or regional safety agencies such as Underwriters Laboratories (UL) or TÜV. A single version of a device may be used in many markets, with the different power requirements met by different external power supplies, so that only one version of the device need be manufactured, stocked, and tested. If the design of the device is modified over time (a frequent occurrence), the power supply design itself need not be retested (and vice versa).
- Constant voltage is produced by a specific type of adapter used for computers and laptops. These types of adapters are commonly known as eliminators.

== Problems ==
A survey of consumers showed widespread dissatisfaction with the cost, inconvenience, and wastefulness of the profusion of power adapters used by electronic devices.

== Efficiency ==
The issue of inefficiency of some power supplies has become well known, with U.S. president George W. Bush referring in 2001 to such devices as "energy vampires". Legislation is being enacted in the EU and a number of U.S. states to reduce the level of energy wasted by some of these devices. Such initiatives include standby power and the One Watt Initiative.

But others have argued that these inefficient devices are low-powered, e.g., devices that are used for small battery chargers, so even if they have a low efficiency, the amount of energy they waste is less than 1% of household consumption of electric energy.

Considering the total efficiency of power supplies for small electronic equipment, the older mains-frequency linear transformer-based power supply was found in a 2002 report to have efficiencies from 20 to 75%, and have considerable energy loss even when powered up but not supplying power. Switched-mode power supplies (SMPSs) are much more efficient; a good design can be 80–90% efficient, and is also much smaller and lighter. In 2002 most external plug-in "wall wart" power adapters commonly used for low-power consumer electronics devices were of linear design, as well as supplies built into some equipment.

External supplies are usually left plugged in even when not in use, and consume from a few watts to 35 watts of power in that state. The report concluded that about 32 billion kilowatt-hours (kWh) per year, about 1% of total electrical energy consumption, could be saved in the United States by replacing all linear power supplies (average efficiency 40–50%) with advanced switching designs (efficiency 80–90%), by replacing older switching supplies (efficiencies of less than 70%) with advanced designs (efficiency of at least 80%), and by reducing standby consumption of supplies to not more than 1 watt.

Since the report was published, SMPSs have indeed replaced linear supplies to a great extent, even in wall warts. The 2002 report estimated that 6% of electrical energy used in the U.S. "flows through" power supplies (not counting only the wall warts). The website where the report was published said in 2010 that despite the spread of SMPSs, "today's power supplies consume at least 2% of all U.S. electricity production. More efficient power supply designs could cut that usage in half".

Since wasted electrical energy is released as heat, an inefficient power supply is hot to the touch, as is one that wastes power without an electrical load. This waste heat is itself a problem in warm weather, since it may require additional air conditioning to prevent overheating, and even to remove the unwanted heat from large supplies.

== Universal power adapters ==
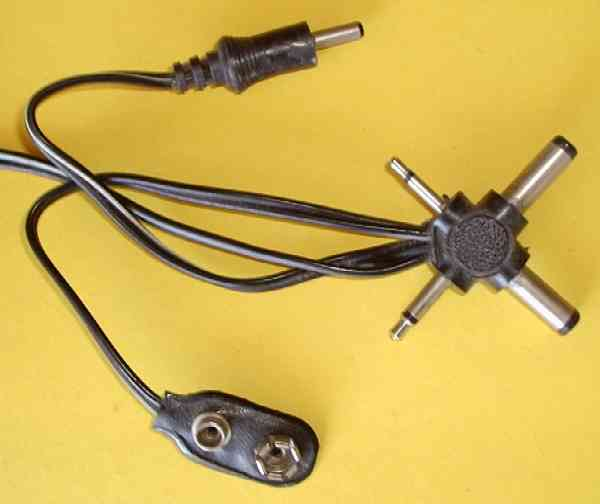
A six-way connector on a "universal" DC power supply, consisting of a four-way X connector and two separate individual connectors (one is the nine-volt battery connector). The X-connector here provides 3.5 and 2.5 mm phone plugs and two sizes of coaxial power connector

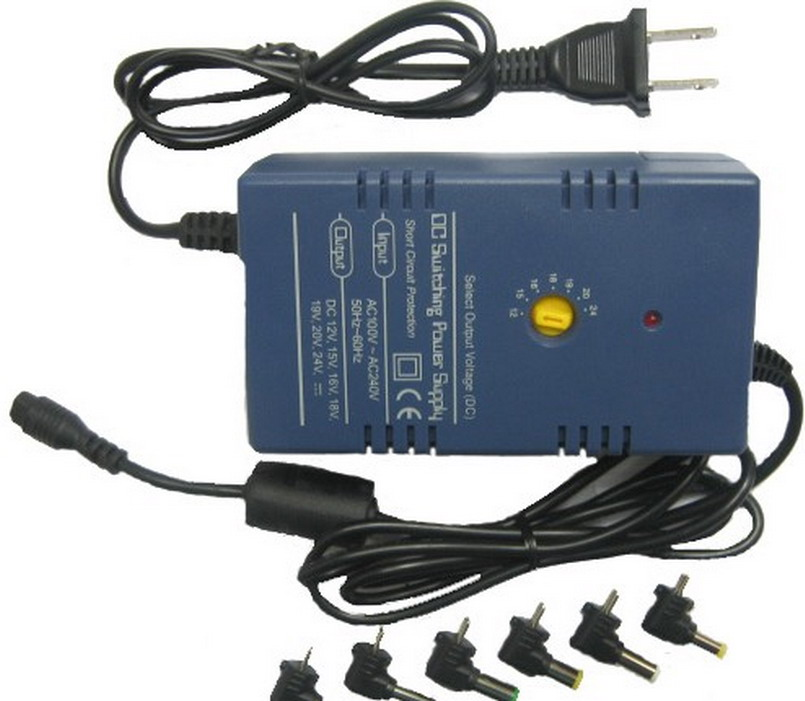
Universal laptop power supply with adjustable voltage between 12 and 24 volts

External power adapters can fail, or can become separated from the product they are intended to power. Consequently, there is a market for replacement adapters. The replacement must match input and output voltages, match or exceed current capability, and be fitted with a matching connector. Many electrical products are poorly labeled with information concerning the power supply they require, so it is prudent to record the specifications of the original power supply in advance, to ease replacement if the original is later lost. Careful labeling of power adapters can also reduce the likelihood of a mixup which could cause equipment damage.

Some "universal" replacement power supplies allow output voltage and polarity to be switched to match a range of equipment. With the advent of switch-mode supplies, adapters which can work with any voltage from 110 VAC to 240 VAC became widely available; previously either 100–120 VAC or 200–240 VAC versions were used. Adapters which can also be used with motor vehicle and aircraft power (see EmPower) are available.

Four-way X connectors or six-way star connectors, also known as spider connectors, with multiple plug sizes and types are common on generic power supplies. Other replacement power supplies have arrangements for changing the power connector, with four to nine different alternatives available when purchased in a set. This allows many different configurations of AC adapters to be put together, without requiring soldering. Philmore and other competing brands offer similar AC adapters with interchangeable connectors.

The label on a power supply may not be a reliable guide to the actual voltage it supplies under varying conditions. Many low-cost power supplies are "unregulated", in that their voltage can change considerably with load. If they are lightly loaded, they may put out much more than the nominal "name plate" voltage, which could damage the load. If they are heavily loaded, the output voltage may droop appreciably, in some cases well below the nominal label voltage even within the nominal rated current, causing the equipment being supplied to malfunction or be damaged. Supplies with linear (as against switched) regulators are heavy, bulky, and expensive.

Modern switched-mode power supplies (SMPSs) are smaller, lighter, and more efficient. They put out a much more constant voltage than unregulated supplies as the input voltage and the load current vary. When introduced, their prices were high, but by the early 21st century the prices of switch-mode components had dropped to a degree which allowed even cheap supplies to use this technology, saving the cost of a larger and heavier mains-frequency transformer.

=== Auto-sensing adapters ===
Some universal adapters automatically set their output voltage and maximum current according to which of a range of interchangeable tips is fitted; tips are available to fit and supply appropriate power to many notebook computers and mobile devices. Different tips may use the same connector, but automatically supply different power; it is essential to use the right tip for the apparatus being powered, but no switch needs to be set correctly by the user. The advent of switch-mode power supplies has allowed adapters to work from any AC mains supply from 100 to 240 V with an appropriate plug; operation from standard 12 V DC vehicle and aircraft supplies can also be supported. With the appropriate adapter, accessories, and tips, a variety of equipment can be powered from almost any source of power.

=== Battery eliminator ===
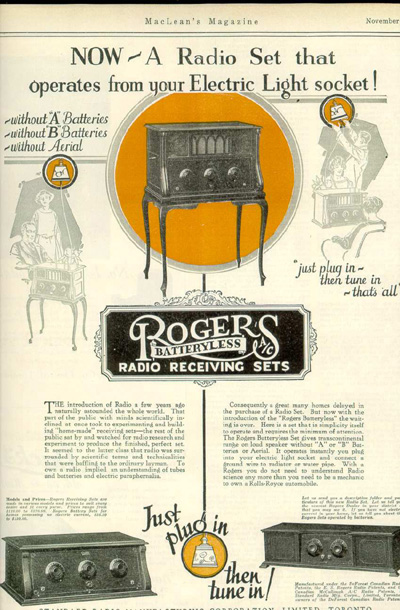
November 1925 magazine ad for battery eliminator

A battery eliminator is an adapter intended to allow a device intended for battery operation, such as a radio, to be operated from an AC outlet.

All radios, except crystal sets, used inconvenient and messy vacuum tube batteries until the mid- to late-1920s. Battery eliminators that plugged into light sockets became very popular. Early commercial units were produced by the Edward S. Rogers, Sr. company in 1925 as a complement to its line of batteryless radios. Another early producer of battery eliminators was the Galvin Manufacturing Corporation (later known as Motorola), which was opened on September 25, 1928, by Paul Galvin and his brother Joseph E. Galvin. Eliminators became obsolete for radios after RCA introduced AC tubes in 1927, enabling receivers to plug into household power. The industry rapidly adopted AC tubes, and companies which launched exclusively manufacture that product such as Philco had to quickly pivot to radio manufacturing to remain relevant and existent.

=== Laptop charger ===
In early laptop computers, the power supply units were internal like in desktop computers. To facilitate portability by sparing physical space and reducing the weight, power supply units were externalized.

When a laptop computer is operated while recharging, the integrated circuitry which controls the charging makes use of a power supply unit's remaining electrical current capacity. This allows supplying the device's components with power during usage while maintaining an uncompromised constant charging speed.

== Use of USB ==
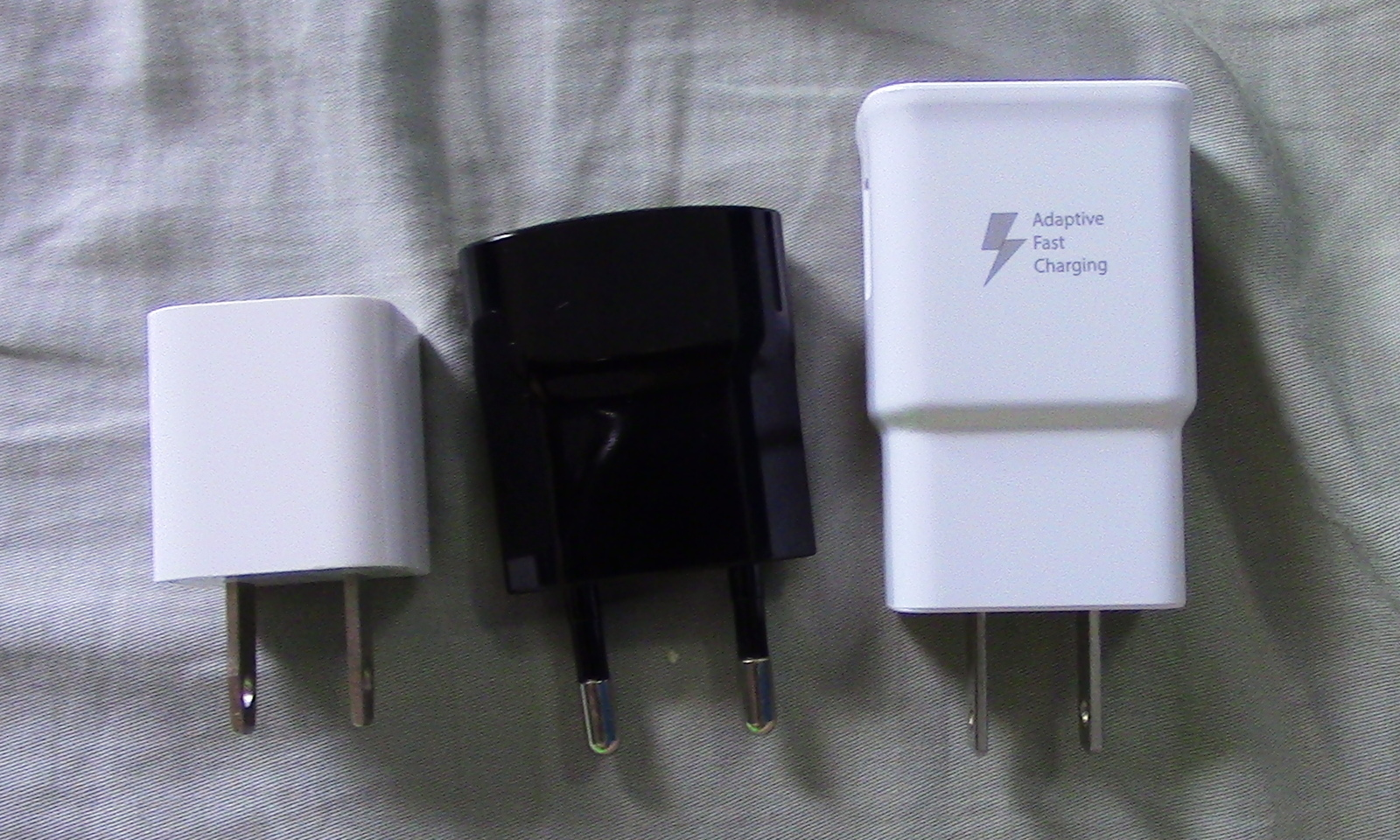
Common sizes of USB AC adapters

The USB connector (and voltage) has emerged as a de facto standard in low-power AC adapters for many portable devices. In addition to serial digital data exchange, the USB standard also provides 5 VDC power, up to 500 mA (900 mA over USB 3.0). Numerous accessory gadgets ("USB decorations") were designed to connect to USB only for DC power and not for data interchange. The USB Implementers Forum in March, 2007 released the USB Battery Charging Specification which defines, "...limits as well as detection, control and reporting mechanisms to permit devices to draw current in excess of the USB 2.0 specification for charging ...". Electric fans, lamps, alarms, coffee warmers, battery chargers, and even toys have been designed to tap power from a USB connector. Plug-in adapters equipped with USB receptacles are widely available to convert 120 VAC or 240 VAC power or 12 VDC automotive power to 5 VDC USB power (see photo at right).

The trend towards more-compact electronic devices has driven a shift towards the micro-USB and mini-USB connectors, which are electrically compatible in function to the original USB connector but physically smaller.

In 2012, a USB Power Delivery Specification was proposed to standardize delivery of up to 100 watts (increased to 240 W in 2021), suitable for devices such as laptop computers that usually depend on proprietary adapters.

== Standards ==
The ITU published Recommendation ITU-T L.1000, "Universal power adapter and charger solution for mobile terminals and other hand-held ICT devices", which specifies a charger similar in most respects to that of the GSMA/OMTP proposal and to the European Common external power supply. The ITU recommendation was expanded and updated in June, 2011. The hope is to markedly reduce the profusion of non-interchangeable power adapters.

The European Union defined a Common external power supply for "hand-held data-enabled mobile phones" (smartphones) sold from 2010, intended to replace the many incompatible proprietary power supplies and eliminate waste by reducing the total number of supplies manufactured. Conformant supplies deliver 5 VDC via a micro-USB connector, with preferred input voltage handled ranging from 90 to 264 VAC.

In 2006 Larry Page, a founder of Google, proposed a 12 V and up to 15 A standard for almost all equipment requiring an external converter, with new buildings fitted with 12 VDC wiring, making external AC-to-DC adapter circuitry unnecessary.

IEC has created a standard for interchangeable laptop power supplies, IEC 62700 (full name "IEC Technical Specification 62700: DC Power supply for notebook computer"), which was published on February 6, 2014.

== See also ==
- AC power plugs and sockets describes the usual sources of power for an AC adapter
- Coaxial power connector has extensive coverage of the profusion of coaxial DC power connectors in use.
- Common external power supply describes standards for mobile phone battery chargers.
- Electronic filter – Electronic device
- Ferrite bead – Passive component (choke) suppressing high-frequency noise in electronic circuits
- MagSafe, a series of Apple power connectors
- Power MOSFET, widely used in most mobile device AC adapters.
- Power supply describes other types of power supplies.
- Power supply unit (computer) (PSU), a desktop computer's equivalent of laptop AC adapter
- Pure sine wave
- Rectifier, an electrical device that converts alternating current (AC) to direct current (DC)
- Switched-mode power supply applications (SMPS)
- Universal Serial Bus § Power – describes the USB standards for DC power delivery to connected devices
- Universal Power Adapter for Mobile Devices (UPAMD) – Power supply standards for 10–130 W (optionally 240 W)
