= 2000-watt society =

Political model

The 2000-watt society concept, introduced in 1998 by the Swiss Federal Institute of Technology in Zurich (ETH Zurich), aims to reduce the average primary energy use of First World citizens to no more than 2,000 watts (equivalent to 2 kilowatt-hours per hour or 48 kilowatt-hours per day) by 2050, without compromising their standard of living.

In a 2008 referendum, more than three-quarters of Zurich's residents endorsed a proposal to lower the city's energy consumption to 2,000 watts per capita and cut greenhouse gas emissions to one ton per capita annually by 2050, with a clear exclusion of nuclear energy. This occasion marked the first democratic legitimization of the concept.

In 2009, energy consumption averaged 6,000 watts in Western Europe, 12,000 watts in the United States, 1,500 watts in China, and 300 watts in Bangladesh. At that time, Switzerland's average energy consumption stood at approximately 5,000 watts, having last been a 2,000-watt society in the 1960s.

The 2000-watt society initiative is supported by the Swiss Federal Office of Energy (SFOE), the Association of Swiss Architects and Engineers, and other bodies.

== Current energy use ==
Breakdown of average energy consumption of 5.1 kW by a Swiss person as of July 2008:

- 1500 watts for living and office space (this includes heat and hot water)
- 1100 watts for food and consumer discretionary (including transportation of these to the point of sale)
- 600 watts for electricity
- 500 watts for automobile travel
- 250 watts for air travel
- 150 watts for public transportation
- 900 watts for public infrastructure

Country	Current use (kW)	Fixed goal (kW)
United States	12	?
India	1	No
China	1.5	No
Switzerland	5	No
Europe	6	No
Switzerland (Zürich)	5	2 by 2050
Switzerland (Basel)	5	2 by ?

According to the Society, Zurich reached a target of less than 4 kW per person in 2020.

In 2020, Switzerland used 6.45 MWh of electricity per capita.

In 2023, individual consumption of electricity was approximately 2.5 MWh per year (285 W as a year-round average).

== Implications ==
Researchers in Switzerland believe that this vision is achievable, despite a projected 65% increase in economic growth by 2050, by using new low-carbon technologies and techniques.

It is predicted that a 2000-watt society will require a complete reinvestment in the country's capital assets, refurbishment of the nation's building stock to meet low-energy building standards, significant improvements in the efficiency of road transport, aviation and energy-intensive material use, the possible introduction of high-speed maglev trains, the use of renewable energy sources, district heating, microgeneration and related technologies, as well as a refocusing of research into new priority areas.

As a result of the intensified research and development effort required, it is hoped that Switzerland will become a leader in the technologies involved. Indeed, the idea has a great deal of government backing, due to fears about climate change.

== Progress towards a 2000-watt society ==
The 2,000-watt society principle is gaining momentum in Switzerland. A 2016 article revealed that 2% of Swiss residents adhere to the 2,000-watt energy limit, with average per capita energy consumption exceeding 5,000 watts. More than 100 municipalities have integrated this objective into their by-laws or energy strategies. Nine complexes in seven cities and towns—Zurich, Basel, Bern, Lucerne, Lenzburg, Kriens, and Prilly/Renens—have been awarded the "2,000-watt area" certificate.

From 2000 to 2020, despite a global increase in energy consumption and greenhouse gas emissions, Switzerland saw notable reductions. The Swiss Federal Office of Energy (FOE) highlights a decrease in per capita energy use from 6,000 to just under 4,000 watts and a nearly 50% cut in greenhouse gas emissions. However, to meet the 2,000-watt society goals by 2050 to 2100, the FOE acknowledges the necessity for more decisive measures, noting the progress is on the right path but could be accelerated.

=== Certification ===
The Swiss Federal Office of Energy stipulates that the 2000-watt sites label is awarded to residential developments demonstrating sustainable practices in construction, operation, renovation, and mobility. This certification integrates the Energy City label with the Swiss Engineers and Architects Association's standards. Developers are encouraged to apply at the project's inception, with certification granted upon verification of compliance with set objectives. The label's validity continues until more than 50% of the project undergoes repurposing, ensuring adherence to established criteria. The assessment encompasses management, communication, construction practices, and approaches to supply, disposal, and mobility.

=== City of Zurich ===
The 2016 Zurich 2000-Watt Society roadmap documents a reduction in per capita energy consumption to 4,200 watts and CO_{2} emissions to 4.7 tonnes. Without additional measures, projections indicate that by 2050, consumption would only decrease to 3,500 watts and CO_{2} emissions to 3.5 tonnes per person, falling short of the goals of 2,500 watts and 1 ton of CO_{2} emissions, respectively. To address this, the roadmap outlines specific strategies for energy supply and buildings, including the installation of more efficient appliances (227 watts), energy efficiency measures for redevelopments (170 watts), new building standards (57 watts), the replacement of fossil and nuclear energy with renewables (505 watts), and the modernization of heating systems (28 watts). In the area of mobility, it suggests efforts to reduce energy consumption for aviation (209 watts) and private transport (50 watts) to achieve the 2050 targets.

=== Basel pilot region ===
Launched in 2001 and located in the metropolitan area of Basel, 'Pilot Region Basel' aims to develop and commercialize some of the technologies involved. The pilot is a partnership between industry, universities, research institutes and the authorities, coordinated by Novatlantis. Participation is not restricted to locally based organizations. The city of Zürich joined the project in 2005 and the canton of Geneva declared its interest in 2008.

Within the pilot region, the projects in progress include demonstration buildings constructed to MINERGIE or Passivhaus standards, electricity generation from renewable energy sources, and vehicles using natural gas, hydrogen and biogas. The aim is to put research into practice, seek continuous improvements, and to communicate progress to all interested parties, including the public.

=== Fribourg smart living building ===
The Smart Living Lab based in Fribourg is a joint research center of EPFL, the School of Engineering and Architecture of Fribourg and the University of Fribourg. Together, they designed the smart living building, which will be both a sustainable structure and an evolving building and whose construction starts in 2022. It will house the activities of some 130 researchers, offering laboratories, offices, conference rooms and some experimental dwellings. In this multiple-use context, the building will become an experimental field of studies in itself and aims to find solutions to energy consumption and the greenhouse gas emissions that it generates.

This construction is the group's first case study, and research projects have been established to help it meet the lab's ambitious goals: limiting its consumption and emissions to the values set for 2050 by the 2000-watt society vision, while considering the whole life cycle of its components.

== See also ==
- Avoiding Dangerous Climate Change
- Carbon footprint
- Climate Change Act 2008
- Energy conservation
- Energy policy
- Low-carbon economy
- Making Sweden an Oil-Free Society, an official report
- One Watt Initiative
- Paris Agreement
- Peak oil
- Sustainable development
- World energy resources and consumption
