= Uswsusp =

Set of command-line utilities for Linux

uswsusp
- Initial release: April 21, 2006; 19 years ago
- Stable release: 1.0 / March 7, 2011; 14 years ago
- Written in: C
- Operating system: Linux
- Available in: English
- License: GNU GPL
- Website: suspend.sourceforge.net

uswsusp, abbreviated from userspace software suspend and stylized as μswsusp, is a set of userspace command-line utilities for Linux that act primarily as wrappers around the Linux kernel hibernation functionality and implement sleep mode (s2ram utility, referred to as "suspend to RAM"), hibernation (s2disk utility, referred to as "suspend to disk"), and hybrid sleep (s2both utility, referred to as "suspend to both"). It supports Linux kernel versions 2.6.17 and newer.

uswsusp supports image checksumming, data compression, disk encryption, and integration with Splashy and fbsplash.
