= Wake-on-ring =

Signal that activates a device via a telephone connection

Wake-on-Ring (WOR) or Wake-on-Modem (WOM) is a specification that allows supported computers and devices to wake up or turn on from a sleeping, hibernating or soft off state (e.g. ACPI state G1 or G2), and begin operation.

The basic premise is that a special signal is sent over phone lines to the computer through its dial-up modem, telling it to fully power-on and begin operation. Common uses were archive databases and BBSes, although hobbyist use was significant.

Fax machines use a similar system, in which they are mostly idle until receiving an incoming fax signal, which spurs operation.

This style of remote operation has mostly been supplanted by Wake-on-LAN, which is newer but works in much the same way.

== See also ==
- RS-232 § Ring Indicator

== Additional resources ==
- "Wake on Modem" entry from Smart Computing Encyclopedia
