= Wake-on-LAN =

Mechanism to wake up computers via a network

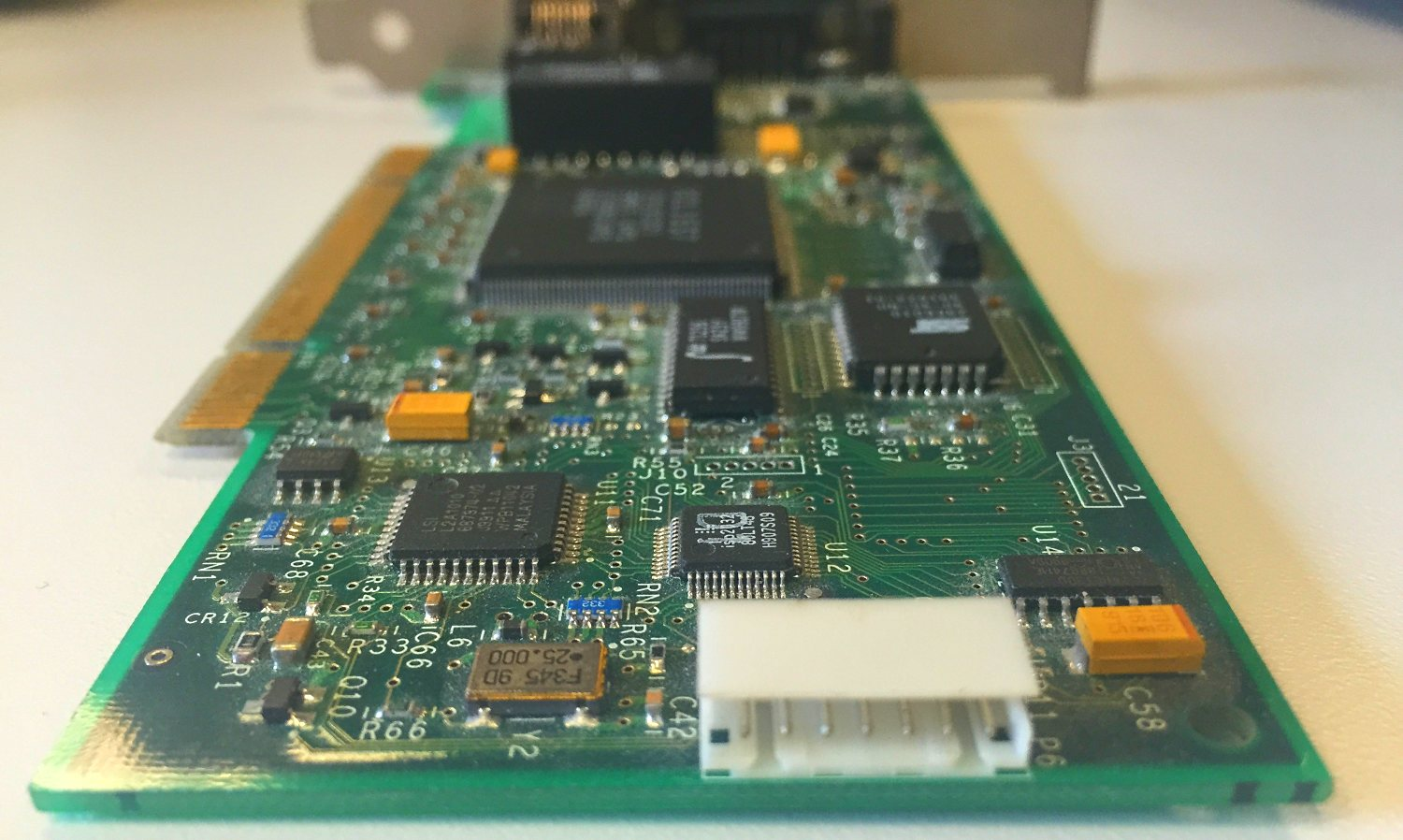
- A dedicated 3-pin Wake-on-LAN connector featured on a legacy network adapter card
- Status: Published standard
- Year started: 1995
- Latest version: 1.0
- Organization: AMD & Hewlett-Packard
- Editors: AMD, HP, Intel, IBM
- Base standards: Ethernet (IEEE 802.3), Token Ring (IEEE 802.5)
- Domain: Computer networking, Power management
- Website: amd.com

Wake-on-LAN (WoL) (Note: Equivalent terms include wake on WAN, remote wake-up, power on by LAN, power up by LAN, resume by LAN, resume on LAN and wake up on LAN.) is an Ethernet or Token Ring computer networking standard that allows a computer to be turned on or awakened from sleep mode by a network message. The message is usually sent to the target computer by a program executed on a device connected to the same local area network (LAN). It is also possible to initiate the message from another network by using subnet directed broadcasts or a WoL gateway service. It is based upon AMD's Magic Packet Technology, which was co-developed by AMD and Hewlett-Packard, following its proposal as a standard in 1995. The standard saw quick adoption thereafter through IBM, Intel and others.

If the computer being awakened is communicating via Wi-Fi, a supplementary standard called Wake on Wireless LAN (WoWLAN) must be employed. The WoL and WoWLAN standards are often supplemented by vendors to provide protocol-transparent on-demand services, for example in the Apple Bonjour wake-on-demand (Sleep Proxy) feature.

== History ==
The basis for the Wake-on-LAN industry standard mechanism today was created around 1994 by AMD in cooperation with Hewlett-Packard, who co-developed AMD's Magic Packet Technology and brought forth their following proposal for it in November 1995 in an AMD white paper. It enabled a remote network device to be woken up through the underlying “power management circuitry”, by sending it a standard Ethernet frame, which “contains a specific data pattern detected by the Ethernet-controller on the receiving end”.

AMD implemented the WoL mechanism in their AMD PCnet II-Family of Ethernet controllers before. The term “Magic Packet” is a AMD trademark.

Wake-on-LAN saw wide adoption starting in October 1996, when IBM formed the Advanced Manageability Alliance (AMA) with Intel. In April 1997, this alliance adopted the Wake-on-LAN technology.

Contrary to most networking protocols, no formal Request for Comments (RFC) documents have been created for Wake-on-LAN, but nevertheless it remains a standard that is widely used in the industry.

== Principle of operation ==
Ethernet connections, including home and work networks, wireless data networks, and the Internet itself, are based on frames sent between computers. WoL is implemented using a specially designed frame called a magic packet, which is commonly sent to all computers in a network, including the computer to be awakened. The magic packet contains the MAC address of the destination computer. This is an identifying number, built into each network interface controller (NIC), that enables the NIC to be uniquely recognized and addressed on a network. In computers capable of Wake-on-LAN, the NIC(s) listen to incoming packets, even when the rest of the system is powered down. If a magic packet arrives and is addressed to the device's MAC address, the NIC signals the computer's power supply or motherboard to awaken. This has the same effect as pressing the power button.

The magic packet is broadcast on the data link layer to all attached devices on a given network, using the network broadcast address; the IP address (which relates to the internet layer) is not used. Because Wake-on-LAN is built upon broadcast messaging, it can generally only be used within a subnet. Wake-on-LAN can, however, operate across any network in practice, given appropriate configuration and hardware, including remote wake-up across the Internet.

In order for Wake-on-LAN to work, parts of the network interface need to stay on. This consumes a small amount of standby power. To further reduce power consumption, the link speed is usually reduced to the lowest possible speed (e.g., a Gigabit Ethernet NIC maintains only a 10 Mbit/s link). Disabling Wake-on-LAN, when not needed, can slightly reduce power consumption on computers that are switched off but still plugged into a power socket. The power drain becomes a consideration on battery-powered devices such as laptops as this can deplete the battery even when the device is completely shut down.

=== Magic packet ===
Magic Packet Protocol Frame

Frame Specifications
Total Payload Size	102 Bytes (Octets)
Data Link Layer	Layer 2 (OSI Model) broadcast frame
Common Transport	UDP Ports 7 or 9 (Encapsulation)
Network Destination	Limited Broadcast (255.255.255.255)

Structural Composition
Sync Prefix	6 Bytes of continuous hex 0xFF
Target Block	96 Bytes (Target MAC repeated 16 times)
Optional Security Tail	0, 4, or 6 Bytes password (SecureOn)

Operational Context
Hardware Requirements	NIC supporting Standby Power (5VSB)
ACPI Power States	S3 (Suspend), S4 (Hibernate), or S5 (Soft Off)

The magic packet is a frame that is most often sent as a broadcast and that contains anywhere within its payload 6 bytes of all 255 (FF FF FF FF FF FF in hexadecimal), followed by sixteen repetitions of the target computer's 48-bit MAC address, for a total of 102 bytes.

Since the magic packet is only scanned for the string above, and not actually parsed by a full protocol stack, it could be sent as payload of any network- and transport-layer protocol, although it is typically sent as a UDP datagram to port 0 (reserved port number), 7 (Echo Protocol) or 9 (Discard Protocol), or directly over Ethernet using EtherType 0x0842. A connection-oriented transport-layer protocol like TCP is less suited for this task as it requires establishing an active connection before sending user data.

A standard magic packet has the following basic limitations:

- Requires the destination computer's MAC address (also may require a SecureOn password)
- Does not provide a delivery confirmation
- May not work outside of the local area network
- Requires hardware support for Wake-on-LAN in the destination computer
- Most 802.11 wireless interfaces do not maintain a link in low-power states and cannot receive a magic packet

The Wake-on-LAN implementation is designed to be simple and to be quickly processed by the circuitry present on the network interface controller using minimal power. Because Wake-on-LAN operates below the IP protocol layer, IP addresses and DNS names are meaningless and so the MAC address is required.

=== Subnet directed broadcasts ===
A principal limitation of standard broadcast Wake-on-LAN is that broadcast packets are generally not routed. This prevents the technique from being used in larger networks or over the Internet. Subnet-directed broadcasts (SDBs) may be used to overcome this limitation. SDB may require changes to the intermediate router configuration. SDBs are treated like unicast network packets until processed by the final (local) router. This router then broadcasts the packet using a layer-2 broadcast. This technique allows a broadcast to be initiated on a remote network but requires all intervening routers to forward the SDB. When preparing a network to forward SDB packets, care must be taken to filter packets so that only desired (e.g. WoL) SDB packets are permitted – otherwise the network may become a participant in DDoS attacks such as the Smurf attack.

=== Troubleshooting magic packets ===
Wake-on-LAN can be a difficult technology to implement because it requires appropriate BIOS/UEFI, network interface hardware and, sometimes, operating system and router support to function reliably. In some cases, hardware may wake from one low-power state but not from others. This means that due to hardware issues, the computer may be wakeable from its soft off state (S5) but doesn't wake from sleep or hibernation or vice versa.

== Security considerations ==
=== Unauthorized access ===
Magic packets are sent via the data link or OSI-2 layer, which can be used or abused by anyone on the same LAN, unless the L2 LAN equipment is capable of and configured for filtering such traffic to match site-wide security requirements.

Firewalls may be used to prevent clients on the public WAN from accessing the broadcast addresses of inside LAN segments, or routers may be configured to ignore subnet-directed broadcasts.

Certain NICs support a security feature called "SecureOn". It allows users to store within the NIC a hexadecimal password of 6 bytes. Clients append this password to the magic packet. The NIC wakes the system only if the MAC address and password are correct. This security measure significantly decreases the risk of successful brute force attacks, by increasing the search space by 48 bits (6 bytes), up to 2^{96} combinations if the MAC address is entirely unknown. However, any network eavesdropping will expose the cleartext password.

Abuse of the Wake-on-LAN feature only allows computers to be switched on; it does not in itself bypass passwords and other forms of security, and is unable to power off the machine once on. However, many client computers attempt booting from a PXE server when powered up by WoL. Therefore, a combination of DHCP and PXE servers on the network can sometimes be used to start a computer with an attacker's boot image, bypassing any security of the installed operating system and granting access to unprotected, local disks over the network.

=== Interactions with network access control ===
The use of Wake-on-LAN technology on enterprise networks can sometimes conflict with network access control solutions such as 802.1X MAC-based authentication, which may prevent magic packet delivery if a machine's WoL hardware has not been designed to maintain a live authentication session while in a sleep state.

=== Security ===
Some PCs include technology built into the chipset to improve security for Wake-on-LAN. For example, Intel AMT (a component of Intel vPro technology). AMT uses TLS encryption to secure an out-of-band communication tunnel to an AMT-based PC for remote management commands such as Wake-on-LAN.

AMT secures the communication tunnel with Advanced Encryption Standard (AES) 128-bit encryption and RSA keys with modulus lengths of 2,048 bits. Because the encrypted communication is out-of-band, the PC's hardware and firmware receive the magic packet before network traffic reaches the software stack for the operating system (OS). Since the encrypted communication occurs below the OS level, it is less vulnerable to attacks by viruses, worms, and other threats that typically target the OS level.

IT shops using Wake-on-LAN through the Intel AMT implementation can wake an AMT PC over network environments that require TLS-based security, such as IEEE 802.1X, Cisco Self Defending Network (SDN), and Microsoft Network Access Protection (NAP) environments. The Intel implementation also works for wireless networks.

== Hardware requirements ==
Wake-on-LAN support is implemented on the motherboard of a computer and in the network interface controller. It is consequently not dependent on the operating system running on the computer. In order to get Wake-on-LAN to work, enabling this feature on the network interface card or on-board silicon is sometimes required. Details of how to do this depend upon the operating system and the device driver.

Wake-on-LAN usually needs to be enabled in the Power Management section of a PC motherboard's BIOS/UEFI setup utility, although on some systems, such as Apple computers, it is enabled by default. On older systems, the BIOS/UEFI setting may be referred to as WoL; on newer systems supporting PCI version 2.2, it may be referred to as PME (Power Management Events, which include WoL). It may also be necessary to configure the computer to reserve standby power for the network card when the system is shut down.

With older motherboards, if the network interface is a plug-in card rather than being integrated into the motherboard, there may be a header onboard connected to the network card via a special three-pin cable to the card. Systems supporting the PCI 2.2 standard and with a PCI 2.2 compliant network adapter card do not usually require a cable as the required standby power is relayed through the PCI bus. The power supply must meet ATX 2.01 specifications.

Laptops powered by the Intel Centrino processor technology or newer (with explicit BIOS/UEFI support) allow waking up the machine using Wake on Wireless LAN (WoWLAN).

In most modern PCs, ACPI is notified of the waking up and takes control of the power-up. In ACPI, OSPM must record the wake source or the device that is causing the power-up – the device being the soft power switch, the NIC (via Wake-on-LAN), the cover being opened, a temperature change, etc.

The three-pin WoL interface on the motherboard consists of: pin 1, +5V DC (red); pin 2, ground (black); pin 3, wake signal (green or yellow). By supplying the pin-3 wake signal with +5V DC, the computer will be triggered to power up provided WoL is enabled in the BIOS/UEFI configuration.

== Software requirements ==
Software that sends a WoL magic packet is referred to in different circles as client or server, which can be a source of confusion. While WoL hardware or firmware is arguably performing the role of a server, Web-based interfaces that act as a gateway through which users can issue WoL packets without downloading a local client often become known as "the Wake-on-LAN server" to users. Additionally, software that administers WoL capabilities from the host OS side may be carelessly referred to as a client on occasion; sleeping machines capable of being awakened with WoL generally tend to be end-user desktops and, as such, are generally client machines in IT parlance but WoL is for the services they are running as, by definition, servers.

=== Creating and sending the magic packet ===
Software to send WoL magic packets is available for all modern platforms, including Windows, Macintosh and Linux, plus many smartphones. Examples include: Wake on LAN GUI, LAN Helper, Magic Packet Utility, NetWaker for Windows, Nirsoft WakeMeOnLAN, WakeOnLANx, EMCO WOL, Aquila Tech Wake on LAN, ManageEngine WOL utility, FusionFenix and SolarWinds WOL Tool.

=== Ensuring the magic packet travels from source to destination ===
If the sender is on the same subnet or local area network as the computer to be awakened, there are generally no issues. When sending over the Internet, and in particular where a network address translation (NAT) router is involved (as typically in most homes), special settings are often necessary.

Further, the WoL protocol operates on a deeper level in the multi-layer networking architecture. To ensure the magic packet gets from source to destination while the destination is sleeping, the ARP binding must typically be set in a NAT router. This allows the router to forward the magic packet to the sleeping computer at the link layer, below Internet Protocol. There are some security implications of ARP binding (see ARP spoofing); however, an attacker must use a computer that is connected directly to the target LAN (plugged into the LAN via cable or connecting to a Wi‑Fi link) to gain access to the LAN.

Most home routers are able to send magic packets to a LAN; for example, routers with the DD-WRT, Tomato or PfSense firmware have a built-in Wake-on-LAN client.

=== Responding to the magic packet ===
Most WoL hardware functionality is typically blocked by default and needs to be enabled using the system BIOS/UEFI setup. Further configuration from the OS is required in some cases, for example via the Device Manager network card properties on Windows operating systems.

==== Microsoft Windows ====
Newer versions of Microsoft Windows integrate WoL functionality into the Device Manager. This is available in the power management tab of each network device's driver properties. For full support of a device's WoL capabilities (such as the ability to wake from an ACPI S5 power-off state), installation of the full driver suite from the network device manufacturer may be necessary, rather than the bare driver provided by Microsoft or the computer manufacturer. In most cases correct BIOS/UEFI configuration is also required for WoL to function.

The ability to wake from hybrid sleep is not officially supported in Windows. This is because of a change in the OS behavior which causes network adapters to be explicitly not armed for WoL when shutdown to these states occurs, so that those adapters don't consume power in what appears to the user to be a shutdown state, even though the system is just hibernating. WoL from a non-hybrid hibernation state when a user explicitly requests hibernation or a sleep state is supported. However, some hardware will enable WoL from states that are unsupported by Windows.

==== Mac hardware and macOS ====
Modern Mac hardware supports WoL functionality when the computer is in a sleep state, but it is not possible to wake up a Mac computer from a powered-off state.

Mac OS X Snow Leopard and later support WoL, which is called Wake on Demand. On laptops, the feature is controlled via the macOS System Settings Battery panel, in the Options pop-up window. The Wake for network access item can be set to "Always", "Only on Power Adapter", or "Never"; "Always" enables Wake-on-LAN even when on battery power, but "Only on Power Adapter" enables it only when connected to a power supply. On desktops, the feature is controlled via the System Settings Energy Saver panel. Marking the Wake for network access checkbox enables Wake-on-LAN. It can also be configured through the terminal using the pmset womp (wake on magic packet) command.

The Apple Remote Desktop client management system can be used to send Wake-on-LAN packets, but there are also freeware and shareware macOS applications available. A mechanism called Bonjour Sleep Proxy, provided by Apple AirPort access points and Apple TVs, allows other machines on a LAN to cause a WoL packet to be sent to a host when that machine accesses one of the host's shared resources.

==== Linux ====
Wake-on-LAN support may be changed using a subfunction of the ethtool command, for example:

ethtool -s eth0 wol g    # Enable
ethtool -s eth0 wol d    # Disable

== Other machine states and LAN wake-up signals ==
A modern computer can be in various power states, with names such as sleep, standby, and hibernate. In some reduced-power modes, the system state is stored in RAM, and the machine can wake up very quickly; in others, the state is saved to disk and the motherboard is powered down, taking at least several seconds to wake up. The machine can be awakened from a reduced-power state by various signals.

The machine's BIOS/UEFI must be set to allow Wake-on-LAN. To allow wake-up from a powered-down state, wake-up on power management event (PME) is also required. The Intel adapter allows "Wake on Directed Packet", "Wake on Magic Packet", "Wake on Magic Packet from power off state", and "Wake on Link".

=== Waking up without operator presence ===
Machines that are not designed to support Wake-on-LAN may be left in a powered-down state after power failure. It may be possible to set the BIOS/UEFI to start such machines up automatically on restoration of power, so that it is never left in an unresponsive state.

Other problems can affect the ability to start or control the machine remotely: hardware failure of the machine or network, failure of the BIOS/UEFI settings battery (the machine will halt when started before the network connection is made, displaying an error message and requiring a keypress), loss of control of the machine due to software problems (machine hang, termination of remote control or networking software, etc.), and virus infection or hard disk corruption.

== Wake on Internet ==
The originator of the wake-up signal (magic packet) does not have to be on the same local area network (LAN) as the computer being woken. It can be sent from anywhere using:

1. A virtual private network (VPN) – which makes the originator appear to be a member of the LAN.
2. The Internet with local broadcasting – some routers permit a packet received from the Internet to be broadcast to the entire LAN; the default TCP or UDP ports preconfigured to relay WoL requests are usually ports 7 (Echo Protocol), 9 (Discard Protocol), or both. This proxy setting must be enabled in the router, and port forwarding rules may need to be configured in its embedded firewall in order to accept magic packets coming from the internet side to these restricted port numbers, and to allow rebroadcasting them on the local network (normally to the same ports and the same TCP or UDP protocol). Such routers may also be configurable to use different port numbers for this proxying service.
3. The Internet without local broadcasting – if (as is often the case) the firewall or router at the destination does not permit packets received from the Internet to be broadcast to the local network, Wake-on-Internet may still be achieved by sending the magic packet to any specified port of the destination's Internet address, having previously set the firewall or router to forward packets arriving at that port to the local IP address of the computer being woken. The router may require reservation of the local IP address of the computer being woken in order to forward packets to it when it is not live.

== See also ==
- Alert on LAN
- Alert Standard Format
- Desktop and mobile Architecture for System Hardware
- Peripheral Component Interconnect § Connector pinout – Power Management Event (PME#) signal
- Real-time clock alarm
- Wired for Management
