= IEC 62700 =

International standard

IEC Technical Specification 62700: DC Power supply for notebook computer is an IEC specification of a common standard for external laptop computer AC adapters. Laptops and AC adapters following this standard will have interchangeable power supplies, which will enable easy reuse of used power supplies (thereby reducing electronic waste) and make buying a new compatible power supply for a laptop simpler.

The specification was published on 6 February 2014.

== Alternatives ==
Despite being an industry open organization with open participation, the standard has been criticized by some for not being openly available for review. Some alternatives include:

- IEEE has a proposed standard Universal Power Adapter for Mobile Devices for laptops and other devices.
- The USB Promoters Group's USB Power Delivery ("PD") specification supports up to 240 W, and is intended to be able to power laptops.
- The EmPower adapter was intended for charging laptops on passenger aircraft.

== See also ==
- Universal charger
- USB Power Delivery Rev. 3.1 - includes Standard Power Range (SPR) mode with up to 100 W of power (20 V @ 4 A) and Extended Power Range (EPR) mode with up to 240 W of power (48 V @ 5 A)
- Common external power supply - EN 62684 / IEC 62684, a widely adopted 2010 European specification standardizing smartphone power supplies on the USB Battery charging specification and USB connectors.
