= USB decoration =

Decorative device that uses the Universal Serial Bus connector

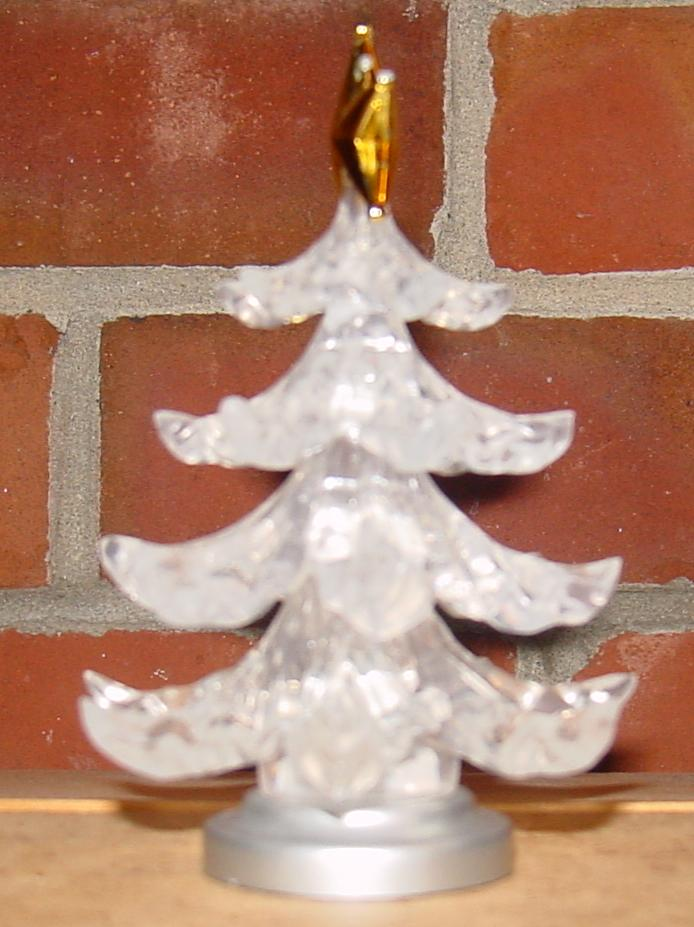
A USB-powered decorative Christmas tree

A USB decoration is a decorative device that uses the Universal Serial Bus (USB) connector for electrical power, and sometimes the protocol, on a computer or other host. In addition, some lightweight devices (e.g., a small lamp on a gooseneck stalk) use the USB connector itself for mechanical support.

== History ==
Decorative computer peripherals have been around for a long time; in the days of CPU front panels, computer hackers would sometimes use them for entertaining or amusing "Blinkenlights" displays. Today, USB-powered decorations are the most prominently seen examples, since the popularity of USB lets them operate on most modern computers. The USB standard can also be used to power devices via AC adapters traditionally used for mobile devices, allowing manufacturers of these decorations worldwide compatibility without the need for any power converters for different socket form factors.

== USB interface ==
Many USB decorations do not use the communications features of the USB bus, or fully comply with USB standard power discipline. This can interfere with the purposes for which the USB bus was designed, especially if the device suddenly attempts to draw the full 500 mA of power nominally available. The default power consumption is only 100 mA, which should not impact the computer's PSU if a device is suddenly connected without identifying itself first. A newly connected device is supposed to then use the USB protocol to communicate a request for more DC power, if needed.

Often, several decorations are connected to a single USB hub, which is limited to 400 mA if it has no external power connection and is drawing all its power from a host computer. With each device drawing 100 mA, it is therefore only possible to run four low-power decorations.

If instead a USB hub has an external power adapter, it may be able to support much higher power loads. In many cases, the powered hub may not even need to be connected to a computer host, but can serve as a stand-alone power source for USB decorations that need only DC power.

== Decorative usage ==
USB decorations may have no useful functionality other than aesthetic ornamentation. For example, lights, lighted cables, displays, miniature disco balls, aquariums, terrariums, waterfalls, and pole dancers are all available in USB-powered versions.

Arguably, there are many USB-based decorations embedded in existing products—keyboards with impractical backlighting (such as ones that only turn on while pressing a key, and ones that flash to the beat of a song), mice that (when the computer is turned off) turn on/off their light to a pre-programmed beat, or printers that show random quotations on LCD screens when not in use.

A similar concept exists in the form of decorations that are powered by car adapter plugs. USB adapters for automobiles (and built-in USB ports in newer models) can also power USB decorations. Some USB devices can even be jury rigged to work on 12 volts with a simple resistor, in which is the electrical opposite of converting a light-up ornament to a DIY USB decoration.

== Functional semi-decorations ==
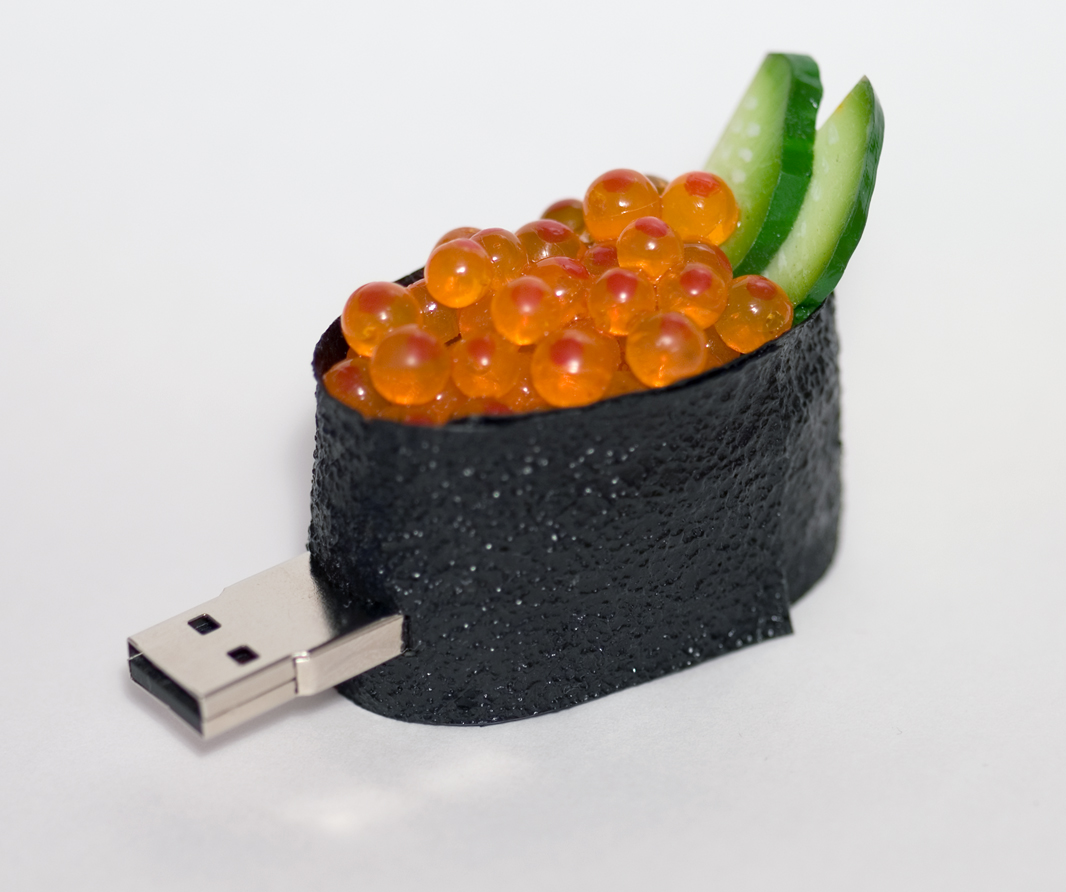
A sushi-themed USB flash drive

Some USB decorations have a non-passive and at least nominal practical purpose. Nightlights, cooling fans, typing speedometers, a beverage chiller, and nodding dogs that guard internet connections are all examples of USB semi-decorations.

Flash drives may similarly be themed for aesthetic or amusement value. Such devices can be viewed anthropologically as pocket-sized versions of the "decorated shed" architecture celebrated by Robert Venturi in his influential book, Learning from Las Vegas: the Forgotten Symbolism of Architectural Form. Although these functional devices are not pure USB decorations, they still have prominent decorative aspects. Usually, these types of devices are simple modifications of ordinary designs, with most or all of the power used for the main function, not for the decoration.

== See also ==
- Laptop cooler
