= Swsusp =

swsusp
- Written in: C
- Operating system: Linux
- License: GNU General Public License

swsusp (Software Suspend) is a kernel feature (i.e., program) which is part of power management framework in the Linux kernel. It is the default suspend framework as of kernel 3.8.

== Objective ==
SWSUSP helps to drive the system to a low power state (called suspend) when not actively used, while providing the ability to return to the same state as before suspend (called resume/restore).

== Features ==
As of 3.8 Swsusp provides the following options under suspend:

- StandBy: the CPU and main memory (RAM) both are powered up (CPU could be in Wait for Interrupt/WFI)
- Suspend to RAM: the CPU could be powered down while the RAM is up and in Self-refresh state.
- Suspend to Disk: a snapshot of the current system including CPU registers and memory contents are stored in an image in non-volatile memory such as a hard disk and the system is powered down.

For more details on Swsusp refer to kernel documentation under Documentation/power/swsusp.txt

== Usage ==
To enable swsusp, the following should be selected during kernel configuration:

Power management options → <*>Power management support (CONFIG_PM) 
Power management options → <*>Software Suspend (CONFIG_SOFTWARE_SUSPEND) 
Power management options → [/dev/resume_partition]Default resume partition (CONFIG_PM_STD_PARTITION) 

The /dev/resume_partition needs to be replaced by the actual swap partition that is to be used for suspending. Otherwise, resume=/dev/resume_partition can be given as a parameter during system bootup. The actual suspend is done by:

echo shutdown > /sys/power/disk; echo disk > /sys/power/state

You may check other suspend options available by doing

cat /sys/power/state

depending on your kernel config, it will show something similar to [standby] mem disk

and options available under disk can be viewed by

cat /sys/power/disk

depending on your kernel config, it will show something similar to [platform] shutdown reboot

swsusp lacks compression and graphical progress indication, which can be provided through Uswsusp.

== See also ==
- TuxOnIce, is another implementation of suspend to disk and is based on SWSUSP. TuxonIce as of date(30/7/13) is maintained as a patch outside mainline kernel.
- uswsusp userspace software for suspending to ram and/or disk
