= Losses in electrical systems =

In an electrical or electronic circuit or power system part of the energy in play is dissipated by unwanted effects, including energy lost by unwanted heating of resistive components (electricity is also used for the intention of heating, which is not a loss), the effect of parasitic elements (resistance, capacitance, and inductance), skin effect, losses in the windings and cores of transformers due to resistive heating and magnetic losses caused by eddy currents, hysteresis, unwanted radiation, dielectric loss, corona discharge, and other effects. There are also losses during electric power transmission.

In addition to these losses of energy, there may be non-technical loss of revenue and profit, leading to electrical energy generated not being paid for, primarily due to theft. These losses include meter tampering and bypassing, arranged false meter readings, faulty meters, and un-metered supply. Non-technical losses are reported to account for up to 40% of the total electricity distributed in some countries. Technical and human errors in meter readings, data processing and billing may occur, and may lead to either over-charging or under-charging.

== Parasitic losses in electricity production ==
With regard to electricity production, "parasitic loss" it is any of the loads or devices powered by the generator, not contributing to net electric yield. It is found by subtracting productive yield from gross yield:

$${GY} - {PY} = {PL}$$

where:

- GY is gross electric yield (the output of the generator);
- PY is productive yield (the electricity which is made available to external electric loads)
- PL is parasitic load.

== See also ==
- Electric power transmission
- Standby power
- Leakage (electronics)
