= EC Regulation No. 1275/2008 =

On 6 January 2010 the European Commission Regulation No. 1275/2008 came into force regulating requirements for standby and off mode electric power consumption of electrical and electronic household and office equipment. This regulation arises from the One Watt Initiative by the International Energy Agency (IEA).

The regulations mandate that from 6 January 2010 "off mode" and standby power shall not exceed 1W, "standby plus" power (providing information or status display in addition to possible reactivation function) shall not exceed 2W. Equipment must where appropriate provide off mode and/or standby mode when the equipment is connected to the mains power source. These figures were halved on 6 January 2013.
