= Universal Power Adapter for Mobile Devices =

Power supply standards for 10–130 W (optionally 240 W)

- Type: Power Adapter

Production history
- Designer: IEEE UPAMD Working Group
- Hot pluggable: Yes
- Daisy chain: Yes

Electrical
- Signal: charging power 10–240 W

The Universal Power Adapter for Mobile Devices (UPAMD), codename IEEE 1823-2015 (before approval P1823), is an IEEE standard for power supply design intended to cater to the power range of 10–130 W (optionally 240 W) for mobile devices like laptop computers. The power supply was required to have an output capacitive energy of less than 15.1 µJ and an inductive energy at disconnect of less than 5.3 µJ.

The standard defines an AC adapter to power devices requiring from 10 W to 130 W (~20 V × 6.5 A) or (extended voltage option) up to 240 W (60 V × 4 A). A new connector (that does not mate with any previously existing connector) is proposed for a lifetime of about ten years with multiple brands and models. This minimum life of adapter was hoped to reduce electronic waste.

A common direct current power plug is intended to make life easier by eliminating the confusion regarding what voltage and current transformer one needs to buy and carry. This can help mobile devices, laptops, many consumer electronic devices, office devices like Ethernet switches/hubs, and wireless routers to use the same power adapter around the world.

This specification defines a communication channel between device and adapter, to negotiate the requirements and supply.

== Usage ==
There seem to be no known examples of commercial deployments of UPAMD in end-user devices. When asked about deployment in 2019, the chair for IEEE 1823 working group wrote the following:

Currently the IT market which 1823 standard was originally intended had been swayed by USB SIG to use type C connector as alternatives. However, EU standard body had made inquiry to see if 1823 should be considered as the preferred connector for the next generation of mobile devices. Also, there are new interests from some automotive industry players that are looking at distributing DC bus inside a car (obvious that 1823 with CAN Bus as control method is preferred than USB type C which was not designed for harsh environment).

As for commercial deployment, unfortunately I don’t have a definite answer for you. Several power supply vendor in Asia had made prototypes about 2 years ago but I did not get any further updates after that.

— Leonard Tsai, "Status for Universal Power Adapter for Mobile Devices (2019)".

== History ==
The Standards Association of the Institute of Electrical and Electronics Engineers (IEEE) approved the Universal Power Adapter for Mobile Devices working group on June 17, 2010. The project was sponsored by the Microprocessor Standards Committee of the IEEE Computer Society.

On 15 May 2015 the standard was published as IEEE Std 1823-2015.

== See also ==
- USB Power Delivery Rev. 3.1 - includes Standard Power Range (SPR) mode with up to 100 W of power (20 V @ 5 A) and Extended Power Range (EPR) mode with up to 240 W of power (48 V @ 5 A)
- IEC 62700 "IEC Technical Specification 62700: DC Power supply for notebook computer"
- Common external power supply for smartphones (EN 62684:2010 / IEC 62684:2011)
