= Standby power =

Consumption of energy by electrical devices while switched off or in standby mode

Standby power or idle power is the electric power electrical appliances consume while in standby mode. It only occurs because some devices claim to be "switched off" on the electronic interface but are actually in a different state (standby mode) such as to power a clock or allow for remote control power-on. Idle current is the electric current electrical appliances draw while in standby mode.

In the past, standby power was primarily a non-issue for users, electricity providers, manufacturers, and government regulators. In the twenty-first century's first decade, awareness of the issue grew, becoming essential for all parties. Up to the middle of the decade, standby power was often several watts or tens of watts per appliance. By 2010, regulations were in place in most developed countries restricting standby power of devices sold to one watt (and half that from 2013).

Vampire power, also known as vampire draw, vampire load, phantom power, phantom draw, phantom load, or ghost load, is the electric power electrical appliances consume while energized but not in any use (including standby mode). Vampire current is the electric current electrical appliances draw while energized but not in any use. A vampire device is one that draws vampire power.

Vampire devices still consume a small amount of power despite not being in use and such power is a complete waste. For all vampire devices, just turning off the power plug or power brick (where possible) or disconnecting it from the power point (mains) can completely solve the problem of vampire power consumption. Having a mains outlets with power switches or a power strip with a power switch eliminates the need to disconnect all devices from the power-point.

== Definition ==
Standby power is electrical power used by appliances and equipment while switched off or not performing their primary function, often waiting to be activated by a remote control. That power is consumed by internal or external power supplies, remote control receivers, text or light displays, and circuits energized when the device is plugged in, even when switched off.

While this definition is inadequate for technical purposes, there is no formal definition; an international standards committee is developing a definition and test procedure.

The term is often used more loosely for any device that continuously must use a small amount of power even when not active; for example, a telephone answering machine must be available at all times to receive calls, and switching off to save energy is not an option. Timers, powered thermostats, and the like are other examples. An uninterruptible power supply could be considered to waste standby power only when the computer it protects is off. Properly disconnecting standby power is, at worst, inconvenient; powering down completely, for example, an answering machine not handling a call, renders it useless.

== Advantages and disadvantages ==
=== Advantages ===
Standby power is often consumed for a purpose, although in the past there was little effort to minimize power used.

- It may enable a device to switch on very quickly without delays that might otherwise occur ("instant-on"). It was used, for example, with CRT television receivers (now supplanted mainly by flat screens), where a small current was passed through the tube heater, avoiding a delay of many seconds in starting up.
- It may be used to power a remote control receiver so that when infrared or radio-frequency signals are sent by a remote control device, the equipment can respond, typically by changing from standby to fully on mode.
- Standby power may be used to power a display, operate a clock, etc., without switching the equipment to full power.
- Battery-powered equipment connected to mains electricity can be kept fully charged although switched on; for example, a mobile telephone can be ready to receive calls without depleting its battery charge.
- It enables devices to either turn on or off into a standby state automatically without human intervention (for example, a timer or Wake-on-LAN).

=== Disadvantages ===
The disadvantages of standby power mainly relate to the energy used (each watt of continuous standby consumes about 9 kWh of electricity per year) and the cost thereof. Devices often used ten watts or more before adopting the One Watt Initiative.

== Magnitude ==
Standby power makes up a portion of homes' miscellaneous electric load, including small appliances, security systems, and other small power draws. The U.S. Department of Energy said in 2008:

Many appliances continue to draw a small amount of power when they are switched off. These "phantom" loads occur in most appliances that use electricity, such as VCRs, televisions, stereos, computers, and kitchen appliances. This can be avoided by unplugging the appliance or using a power strip and using the switch on the power strip to cut all power to the appliance.

Standby power used by older devices can be as high as 10–15 W per device, while a modern HD LCD television may use less than 1 W in standby mode. Some appliances use no energy when turned off. Many countries adopting the One Watt Initiative now require new devices to use no more than 1 W starting in 2010 and 0.5 W in 2013.

Although the power needed for functions such as displays, indicators, and remote control functions is relatively small, the large number of such devices and their continuous plugging in resulted in energy usage before the One Watt regulations of 8 to 22 percent of all appliance consumption in different countries, or 32 to 87 W. This was around 3–10 percent of total residential consumption. In 2004, standby modes on electronic devices accounted for 8% of all British residential power. A similar study in France in 2000 found that standby power accounted for 7% of total residential consumption.

In 2004, the California Energy Commission produced a report containing typical standby and operational power consumption for 280 household devices, including baby monitors and toothbrush chargers.

In 2006, some electronics, such as microwaves, CRTs, and VHS players, used more standby power than appliances manufactured in the previous five years.

In the US the average home used an average of 10,649 kWh of electricity per year in 2019, down from 11,040 kWh in 2008. Each watt of power consumed by a device running continuously consumes about 9 kWh (1 W × 365.25 days/year × 24 hours/day) per year, a little less than one thousandth of the annual US household consumption. Unplugging a device constantly consuming standby power saves a yearly 9 kWh for each watt of continuous consumption (saving $1 per year at average US rates).

Devices such as security systems, fire alarms, and digital video recorders require continuous power to operate properly (though in the case of electric timers used to disconnect other devices on standby, they actually reduce total energy usage). The Reducing Consumption section below provides information on reducing standby power.

== Fire risks ==
There is a risk of fire from devices in standby mode. Televisions, in particular, have been reported to catch fire in standby mode.

Before the development of modern semiconductor electronics, it was not uncommon for devices, typically television receivers, to catch fire when plugged in but switched off, sometimes when fully switched off rather than on standby. This is much less likely with modern equipment, but not impossible. Older cathode-ray tube display equipment (television and computer displays) had high voltages and currents and were far more of a fire risk than thin-panel LCDs and other displays.

Contributing factors for electrical fires include:

- Damp environments
- Lightning strikes affecting building wiring
- Age of the appliance—older appliances are less well designed for safety, and may have deteriorated

== Policy ==
The One Watt Initiative was launched by the IEA in 1999 to ensure through international cooperation that by 2010 all new appliances sold in the world only use one watt in standby mode. This would reduce CO_{2} emissions by 50 million tons in the OECD countries alone by 2010.

In July 2001 U.S. President George W. Bush signed an executive order directing federal agencies to "purchase products that use no more than one watt in their standby power consuming mode".

In July 2007 California's 2005 appliance standards came into effect, limiting external power supply standby power to 0.5 watts.

On 6 January 2010, the European Commission (EC) Regulation No 1275/2008 came into force. The regulations mandate that from 6 January 2010, "off mode" and standby power for electrical and electronic household and office equipment shall not exceed 1W, and "standby plus" power (providing information or status display in addition to possible reactivation function) shall not exceed 2W. Equipment must, where appropriate, be provided in off mode or standby mode when the equipment is connected to the primary power source. These figures were halved on 6 January 2013.

== Determining standby power ==
=== Identifying devices ===
The following types of devices consume standby power.

- Transformers for voltage conversion.
- AC adapter power supplies powering devices that are switched off.
- Many devices with "instant-on" functions that respond immediately to user action without warm-up delay.
- Commonly used LED strips and such low power household lights.
- Electronic and electrical devices in standby mode that can be woken by a remote control, e.g. some air conditioners, audio-visual equipment such as a television receiver
- Electronic and electrical devices that can carry out some functions even when switched off, e.g. with an electrically powered timer. Most modern computers consume standby power, allowing them to be woken remotely (e.g. by Wake on LAN) or at a specified time. These functions are always enabled even if not needed; power can be saved by disconnecting from mains (sometimes by a switch on the back), but only if functionality is not needed.
- Uninterruptible power supplies (UPS)

Other devices consume standby power required for normal functioning that cannot be saved by switching off when not used. For these devices, electricity can only be saved by choosing units with minimal permanent power consumption:

- Cordless telephones and answering machines
- Timers that operate devices
- Security systems and fire alarms
- Transformer-powered doorbells
- Programmable thermostats
- Motion sensors, light sensors, built-in timers and automatic sprinklers

=== Estimating standby power ===
Standby power consumption can be estimated using tables of standby power used by typical devices, although standby power used by appliances of the same class vary extremely widely (for a CRT computer display standby power is listed at a minimum of 1.6 W, maximum 74.5 W). Total standby power can be estimated by measuring total house power with all devices standing by, then disconnected, but this method is inaccurate and subject to large errors and uncertainties.

=== Measuring standby power ===
The power wasted in standby must go somewhere; it is dissipated as heat. The temperature, or perceived warmth, of a device on standby long enough to reach a stable temperature gives some idea of power wasted.

For most home applications, wattmeters give a good indication of energy used and some indication of standby consumption.

A wattmeter is used to measure electrical power. Inexpensive plugin wattmeters, sometimes described as energy monitors, are available from prices of around US$10. Some more expensive models for home use have remote display units. In the US wattmeters can often also be borrowed from local power authorities or a local public library. Although accuracy of measurement of low AC current and quantities derived from it, such as power, is often poor, these devices are nevertheless indicative of standby power, if sensitive enough to register it. Some home power monitors simply specify an error figure such as 0.2%, without specifying the parameter subject to this error (e.g., voltage, easy to measure), and without qualification. Errors of measurement at the low standby powers used from about 2010 (i.e., less than a few watts) may be a very large percentage of the actual value—accuracy is poor. Modification of such meters to read standby power has been described and discussed in detail (with oscilloscope waveforms and measurements). Essentially, the meter's shunt resistor, used to generate a voltage proportional to load current, is replaced by one of value typically 100 times larger, with protective diodes. Readings of the modified meter have to be multiplied by the resistance factor (e.g. 100), and maximum measurable power is reduced by the same factor.

Professional equipment capable of (but not specifically designed for) low-power measurements clarifies typically that the error is a percentage of full-scale value, or a percentage of reading plus a fixed amount, and valid only within certain limits.

In practice, accuracy of measurements by meters with poor performance at low power levels can be improved by measuring the power drawn by a fixed load such as an incandescent light bulb, adding the standby device, and calculating the difference in power consumption.

Less expensive wattmeters may be subject to significant inaccuracy at low current (power). They are often subject to other errors due to their mode of operation:

- If the load is highly reactive, the power shown by some meters may be inaccurate. Meters capable of displaying power factor do not have this problem.
- Many AC meters are designed to give readings that are only meaningful for the sinusoidal waveforms of normal AC power. Waveforms for switched-mode power supplies as used in much electronic equipment may be very far from sinusoidal, causing power readings of such meters to be meaningless. Meters specified to read "RMS power" do not have this problem.

Laboratory-grade equipment designed for low power measurement, which costs from several hundreds of US dollars and is much larger than simple domestic meters, can measure power down to very low values without any of these effects. The US IEC 62301 recommendation for measurements of active power is that power of 0.5 W or greater shall be made with an uncertainty of 2%. Measurements of less than 0.5 W shall be made with an uncertainty of 0.01 W. The power measurement instrument shall have a resolution of 0.01 W or better.

Even with laboratory-grade equipment measurement of standby power has its problems. There are two basic ways of connecting equipment to measure power; one measures the correct voltage, but the current is wrong; the error is negligibly small for relatively high currents, but becomes large for the small currents typical of standby—in a typical case a standby power of 100 mW would be overestimated by over 50%. The other connection gives a small error in the voltage but accurate current, and reduces the error at low power by a factor of 5000. A laboratory meter intended for measurement of higher powers may be susceptible to this error. Another issue is the possibility of measuring equipment damage if in a very sensitive range capable of measuring a few milliamps; if the device being measured comes out of standby and draws several amps, the meter can be damaged unless it is protected.

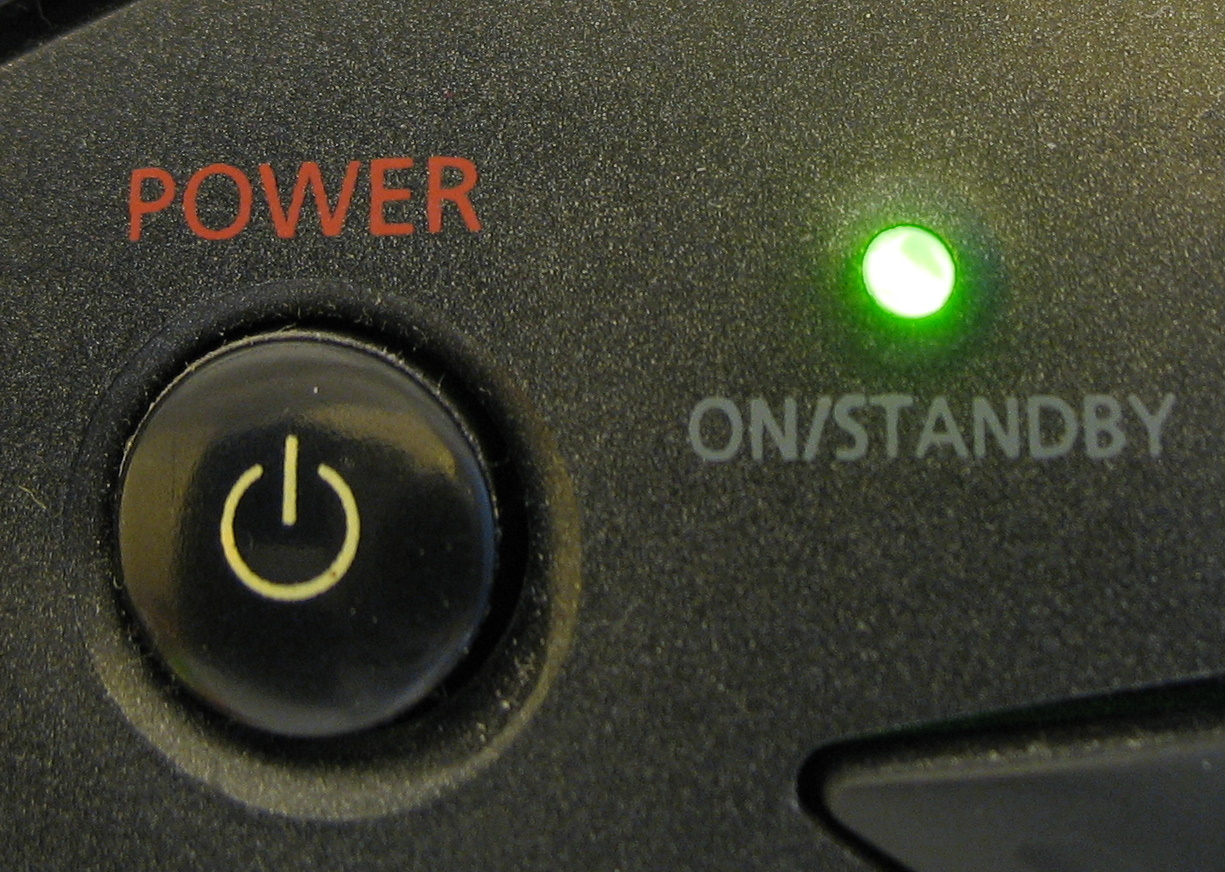
Standby Indicator

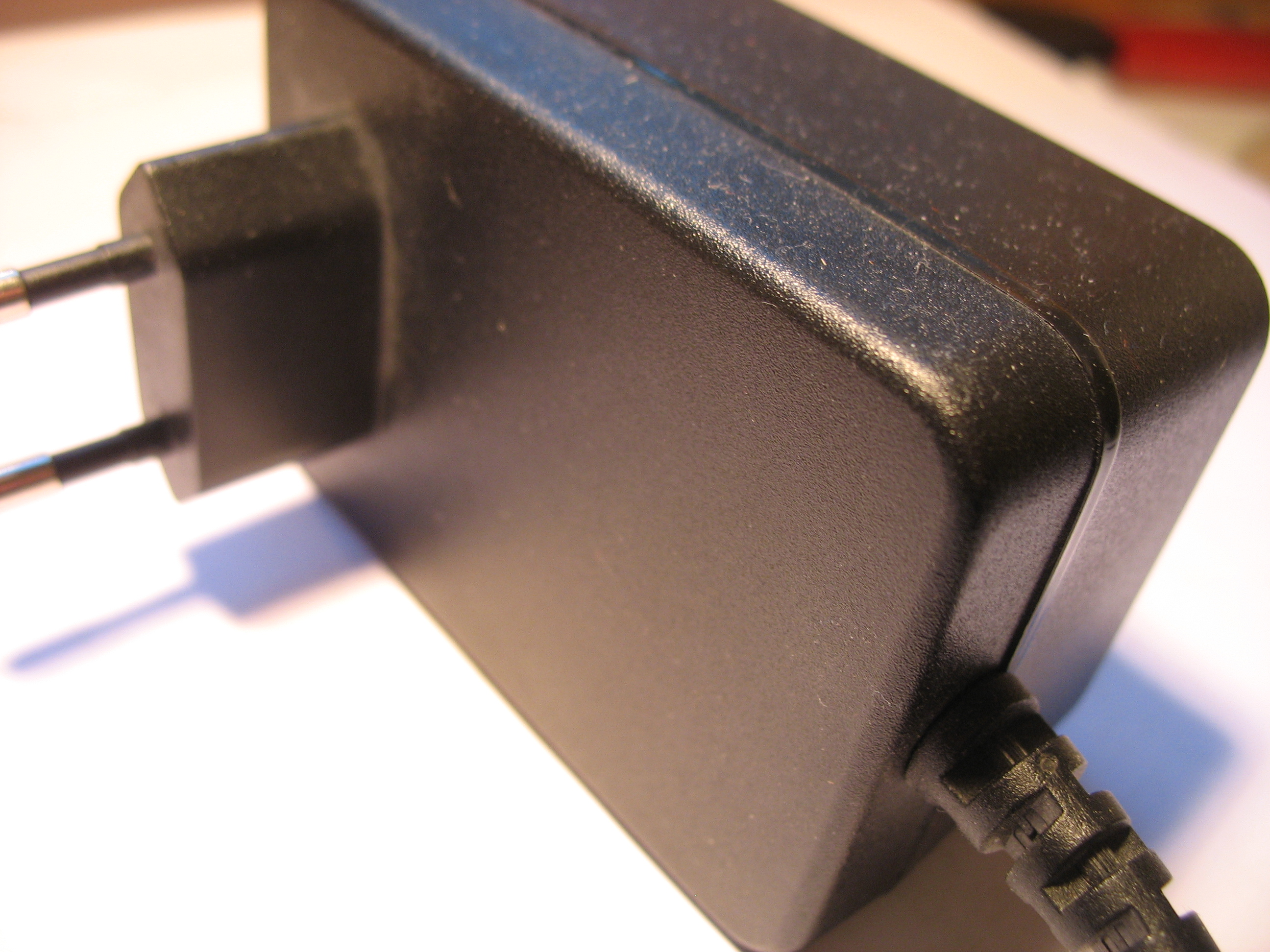
DC Power adaptor

== Reducing standby consumption ==
=== Operating practices ===
Some equipment has a quick-start mode; standby power is eliminated if this mode is not used. Video game consoles often use power when they are turned off, but the standby power can be further reduced if the correct options are set. For example, a Wii console can go from 18 watts to 8 watts to 1 watt by turning off the WiiConnect24 and Standby Connection options.

Devices that have rechargeable batteries and are always plugged in use standby power even if the battery is fully charged. Corded appliances such as vacuum cleaners, electric razors, and simple telephones do not need a standby mode and do not consume the standby power that cordless equivalents do.

Older devices with power adapters that are large and are warm to the touch use several watts of power. Newer power adapters that are lightweight and are not warm to the touch may use less than one watt.

Standby power consumption can be reduced by unplugging or totally switching off, if possible, devices with a standby mode not currently in use; if several devices are used together or only when a room is occupied, they can be connected to a single power strip that is switched off when not needed. This may cause some electronic devices, particularly older ones, to lose their configuration settings.

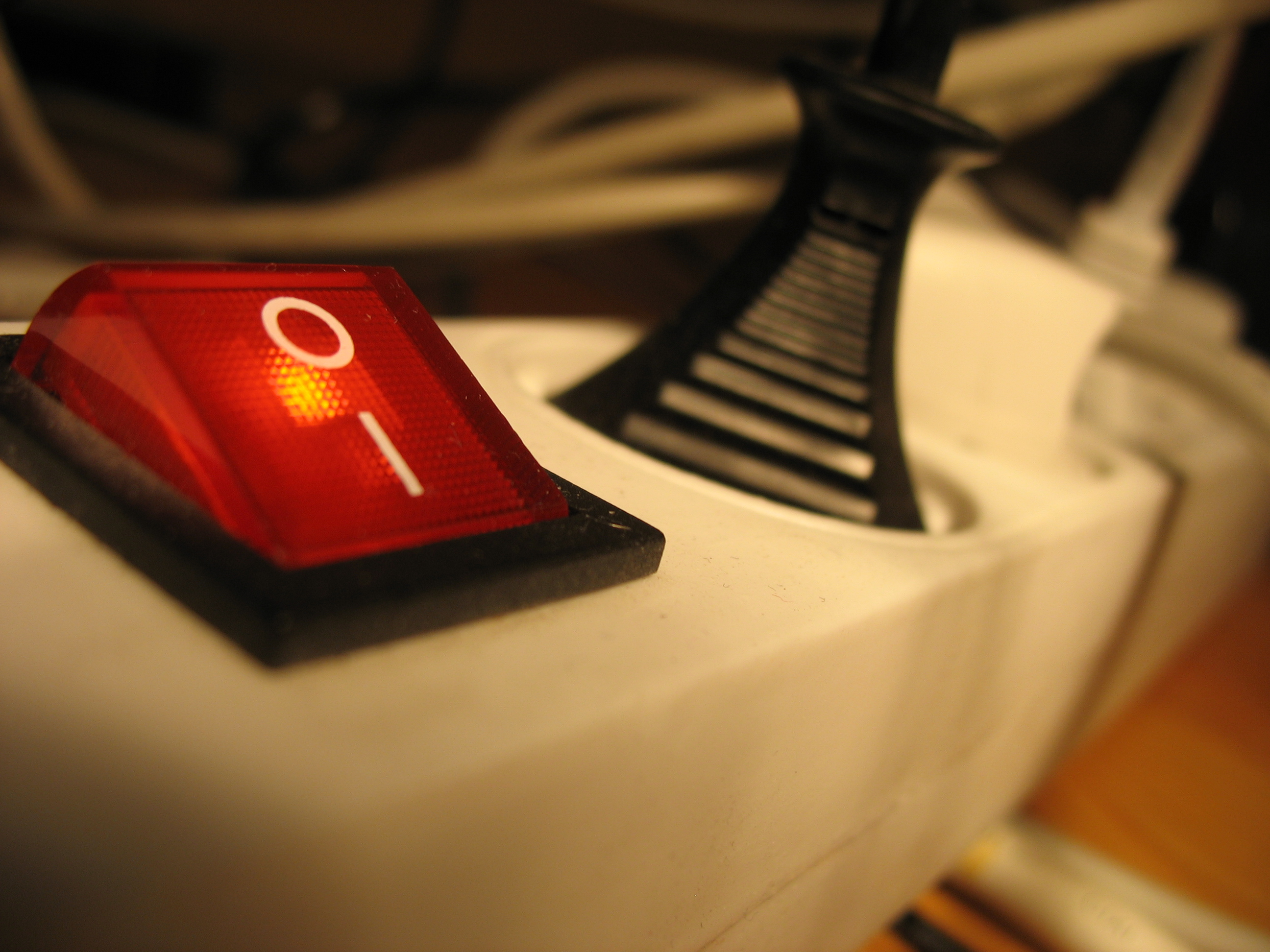
A switchable power strip or power bar

Timers can be used to turn off standby power to devices that are unused on a regular schedule. Switches that turn the power off when the connected device goes into standby, or that turn other outlets on or off when a device is turned on or off are also available. Switches can be activated by sensors. Home automation sensors, switches and controllers can be used to handle more complex sensing and switching. This produces a net saving of power so long as the control devices themselves use less power than the controlled equipment in standby mode.

Standby power consumption of some computers can be reduced by turning off components that use power in standby mode. For instance, disabling Wake-on-LAN (WoL), "wake on modem", "wake on keyboard" or "wake on USB" may reduce power when in standby. Unused features may be disabled in the computer's BIOS setup to save power.

Devices were introduced in 2010 that allow the remote controller for equipment to be used to totally switch off power to everything plugged into a power strip. It was claimed in the UK that this could save £30, more than the price of the device, in one year.

=== Equipment efficiency ===
As users of energy and government authorities have become aware of the need not to waste energy, more attention is being paid to the electrical efficiency of devices (fraction of power consumed that achieves functionality, rather than waste heat); this affects all aspects of equipment, including standby power. Standby power use can be decreased both by attention to circuit design and by improved technology. Programs directed at consumer electronics have stimulated manufacturers to cut standby power use in many products. It is probably technically feasible to reduce standby power by 75% overall; most savings will be less than a watt, but other cases will be as large as 10 watts.

For example, a commercially available computer in Wake-on-LAN standby typically consumed 2 to 8 watts of standby power as of 2011, but it was possible to design much more efficient circuitry: a purpose-designed microcontroller can reduce total system power to under 0.5 watts, with the microcontroller itself contributing 42 mW.

== See also ==
- Green computing
- List of energy storage projects
- Low-power electronics
- Miscellaneous electric load
- Parasitic load
- AC adapter
- Losses in electrical systems
