= Alert on LAN =

Alert on LAN (AOL, sometimes AoL) is a 1998, IBM- and Intel-developed technology that allows for remote management and control of networked PCs. AOL requires a Wake on LAN adapter.

== Technical details ==
The main idea of AOL is to send warnings to remote administrators about different PC conditions using a LAN. These conditions include:

- System unplugged from power source
- System unplugged from network
- Chassis intrusion
- Processor removal
- System environmental errors
- High temperature
- Fan speed
- Voltage fluctuations
- Operating system errors
- System power-on errors
- System is hung
- Component failure

Alert on LAN 2 (AOL2) extends AOL to allow active PC management, including:

- Remote system reboot upon report of a critical failure
- Repair Operating System
- Update BIOS image
- Perform other diagnostic procedures

== See also ==
- Wake-on-LAN
- Alert Standard Format
- Desktop and mobile Architecture for System Hardware

== Additional resources ==
- AOL Introduction from IBM
