= Sleep mode =

Low-power mode for electronic devices

Sleep mode symbol standardized in IEEE 1621

Sleep mode (or suspend to RAM or stand by) is a low-power mode for electronic devices such as computers, televisions, and remote controlled devices. Sleep modes save significantly on electrical consumption compared to leaving a device fully on and, upon resuming to a working state, allow the user to avoid having to reissue instructions or wait for a machine to boot.

Many devices signify this power mode with a pulsed or red-colored LED power light.

== Computers ==
In computers, entering a sleep state is roughly equivalent to "pausing" the state of the machine. When restored, the operation continues from the same point, having the same applications and files open.

=== Sleep ===
Sleep mode has gone by various names, including Stand By, Suspend and Suspend to RAM. Machine state is held in RAM and, when placed in sleep mode, the computer cuts power to unneeded subsystems and places the RAM into a minimum power state, just sufficient to retain its data. Because of the large power saving, most laptops automatically enter this mode when the computer is running on batteries and the lid is closed. If undesired, the behavior can be altered in the operating system settings of the computer.

A computer must consume some energy while sleeping in order to power the RAM and to be able to respond to a wake-up event. A sleeping PC is on standby power, and this is covered by regulations in many countries, for example in the United States limiting such power under the One Watt Initiative, from 2010. In addition to a wake-up press of the power button, PCs can also respond to other wake cues, such as from keyboard, mouse, incoming telephone call on a modem, or local area network signal.

A real-time clock alarm can schedule the computer to wake from sleep mode.

=== Hibernation ===
Hibernation, also called Suspend to Disk on Linux, saves all computer operational data on the fixed disk before turning the computer off completely. On switching the computer back on, the computer is restored to its state prior to hibernation, with all programs and files open, and unsaved data intact. In contrast with standby mode, hibernation mode saves the computer's state on the hard disk, which requires no power to maintain, whereas standby mode saves the computer's state in RAM, which requires a small amount of power to maintain.

=== Hybrid sleep ===
Sleep mode and hibernation can be combined: the contents of RAM are first copied to non-volatile storage like for regular hibernation, but then, instead of powering down, the computer enters sleep mode. This approach combines the benefits of sleep mode and hibernation: The machine can resume instantaneously, but it can also be powered down completely (e.g. due to loss of power) without loss of data, because it is already effectively in a state of hibernation. This mode is called "hybrid sleep" in Microsoft Windows starting in Windows Vista.

A hybrid mode is supported by some portable Apple Macintosh computers, compatible hardware running Windows Vista or newer, and Linux distributions running kernel 3.6 or newer.

=== ACPI ===
ACPI (Advanced Configuration and Power Interface) is the current standard for power management, superseding APM (Advanced Power Management) and providing the backbone for sleep and hibernation on modern computers. Sleep mode corresponds to ACPI mode S3. When a non-ACPI device is plugged in, Windows will sometimes disable stand-by functionality for the whole operating system. Without ACPI functionality, as seen on older hardware, sleep mode is usually restricted to turning off the monitor and spinning down the hard drive.

=== Microsoft Windows ===
Microsoft Windows 2000 and later support sleep at the operating system level (ACPI S3 state) without special drivers from the hardware manufacturer, with the exception of video adapters. Windows Vista's Hybrid sleep feature saves the contents of volatile memory to hard disk before entering sleep mode. If power to memory is lost, it will use the hard disk to wake up. The user has the option of hibernating directly if they wish. On PCs that enable Modern Standby, Hybrid sleep feature is unavailable.

In older versions prior to Windows Vista, sleep mode was under-used in business environments as it was difficult to enable organization-wide without resorting to third-party software. As a result, these earlier versions of Windows were criticized for wasting energy.

A variety of third-party PC power management software exists for newer versions of Windows, offering features beyond those built into the operating system. Most products offer Active Directory integration and per-user/per-machine settings with the more advanced offering multiple power plans, scheduled power plans, anti-insomnia features and enterprise power usage reporting.

=== macOS ===
Sleep on macOS consists of the traditional sleep, Safe Sleep, and Power Nap. In System Preferences, Safe Sleep is referred to as sleep. Since Safe Sleep also allowed state to be restored in an event of a power outage, unlike other operating systems, hibernate was never offered as an option.

In 2005, some Macs running Mac OS X v10.4 began to support Safe Sleep. The feature saves the contents of volatile memory to the system hard disk each time the Mac enters Sleep mode. The Mac can instantaneously wake from sleep mode if power to the RAM has not been lost. However, if the power supply was interrupted, such as when removing batteries without an AC power connection, the Mac would wake from Safe Sleep instead, restoring memory contents from the hard drive.

Safe Sleep capability is found in Mac models starting with the October 2005 revision of the PowerBook G4 (Double-Layer SD). Mac OS X v10.4 or higher is also required.

In 2012, Apple introduced Power Nap with OS X Mountain Lion (10.8) and select Mac models. Power Nap allows the Mac to perform tasks silently, such as iCloud syncing and Spotlight indexing. Only low energy tasks are performed when on battery power, while higher energy tasks are performed with AC power.

== Smartphones ==
Smartphone platforms, such as iPhone, Android and Windows Phone, can support smart standby method. If the power button is pressed, the screen is turned off, but it can still retrieve notifications and play sound.

== Unicode ==
Because of widespread use of this symbol, a campaign was launched to add a set of power characters to Unicode. In February 2015, the proposal was accepted by Unicode and the characters were included in Unicode 9.0. The characters are in the "Miscellaneous Technical" block within code point range 23FB–23FE.

== Wake-on-LAN ==
Wake-on-LAN (WoL) (Note: Equivalent terms include wake on WAN, remote wake-up, power on by LAN, power up by LAN, resume by LAN, resume on LAN and wake up on LAN.) is an Ethernet or Token Ring computer networking standard that allows a computer to be turned on or awakened from sleep mode by a network message. The message is usually sent to the target computer by a program executed on a device connected to the same local area network (LAN). It is also possible to initiate the message from another network by using subnet directed broadcasts or a WoL gateway service. It is based upon AMD's Magic Packet Technology, which was co-developed by AMD and Hewlett-Packard, following its proposal as a standard in 1995. The standard saw quick adoption thereafter through IBM, Intel and others.

If the computer being awakened is communicating via Wi-Fi, a supplementary standard called Wake on Wireless LAN (WoWLAN) must be employed. The WoL and WoWLAN standards are often supplemented by vendors to provide protocol-transparent on-demand services, for example in the Apple Bonjour wake-on-demand (Sleep Proxy) feature.

== See also ==
- Shutdown (computing)
- Modern Standby
