= Minergie =

Swiss building standard

Minergie Logo as registered since 2017.

Minergie is the Swiss building standard for comfort, efficiency and climate protection. Minergie provides incentives to increase energy efficiency and climate protection in the planning, construction and operation of new and existing buildings. A particular focus is placed on high-quality building envelopes and controlled air exchange. Minergie buildings are also characterized by the consistent use of renewable energies and by harnessing the potential of solar power. They are CO₂-free in operation and minimize greenhouse gas emissions during construction. The protected Swiss brand for climate-friendly building is owned by the Minergie Association, based in Basel.

The requirements are defined differently for twelve building categories (multi-family houses, single-family houses, offices, schools, retail, restaurants, assembly halls, hospitals, industry, storage, sports facilities, indoor swimming pools). Requirements also differ between retrofits of existing buildings and new constructions. Minergie has significantly contributed to the fact that Swiss energy legislation in the building sector is regarded internationally as progressive.

== History ==
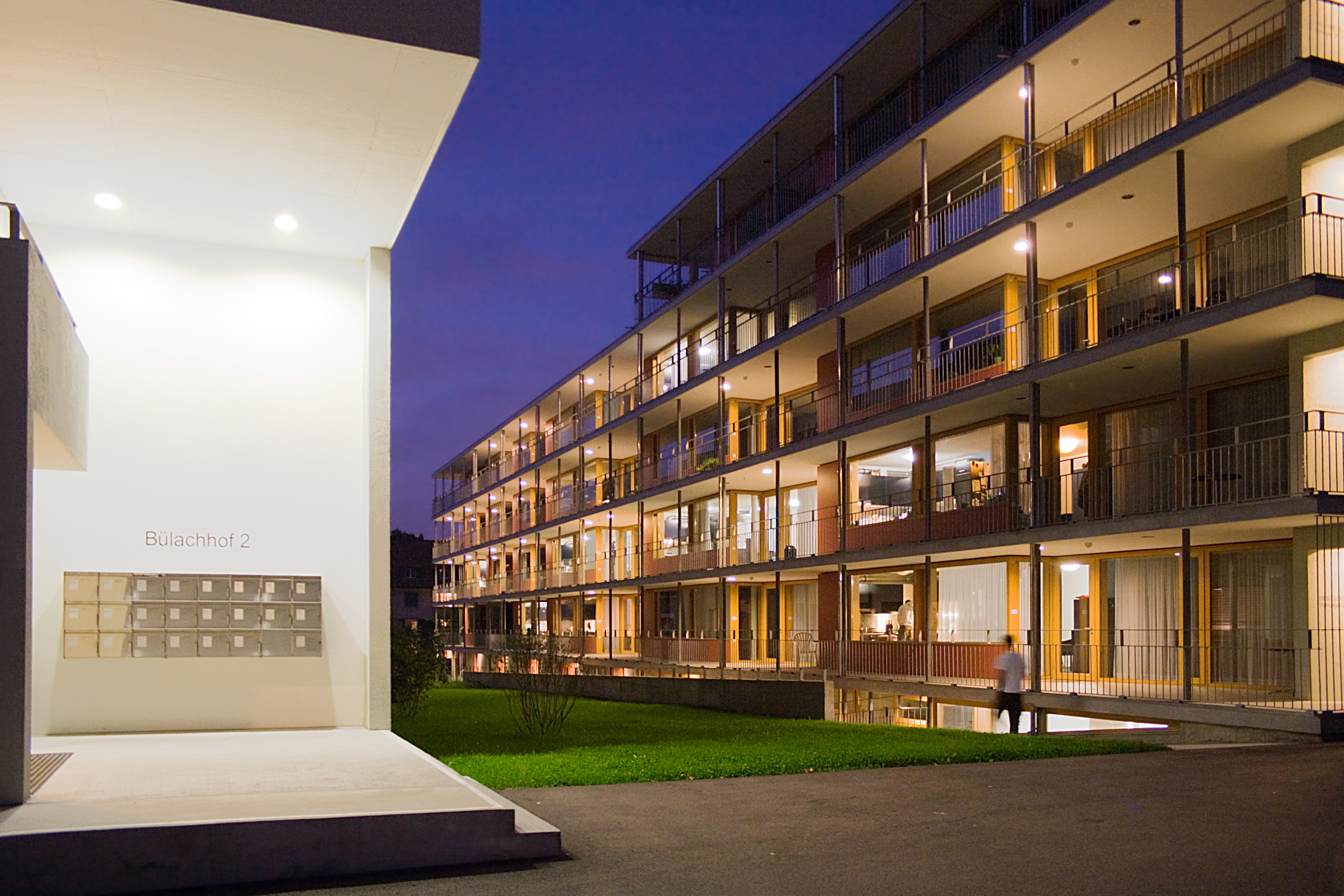
The Bülachhof student housing complex in Zurich is a large new Minergie building.

The idea was the brainchild of Heinz Uebersax and Ruedi Kriesi, and in 1994 the first two Minergie houses were built in Kölliken, Switzerland. The basis for this came from architectural and operational experience gained with the zero-heating-energy housing estate in Wädenswil, realized between 1988 and 1990 by energy engineer Ruedi Kriesi and architect Ruedi Fraefel. Initially, the brand was privately owned by Heinz Uebersax until it was taken over in 1997 by the cantons of Zurich and Bern.

During these years, Kriesi’s vision and technical concepts and Uebersax’s marketing concept and business model converged into today’s Minergie operational model – with Kriesi, then head of the Zurich Energy Office, as the first implementer, leading to the founding of the Swiss association in 1998. Franz Beyeler acted as its first managing director. The canton of Bern, represented by Ruedi Meier, played a pioneering role as co-initiator, communicator, and organizer of the construction and Minergie fair. The association is also open to natural and legal persons.

The first product was Minergie as a low-energy standard. At the end of 2001, Minergie-P was developed. In 2011, the zero-energy standard Minergie-A was introduced. Since 2006, all building standards have been combinable with the Zusatz (add-on) ECO for ecological and healthy building, thanks to cooperation with the association ecobau. The number of buildings certified to one of the Minergie standards in Switzerland represents a very high market share by international comparison.

From 2016, Andreas Meyer Primavesi took over as managing director. In the same year, Minergie launched the most significant changes since its founding. As part of a reorganization, an office with its own employees was established. In addition, the three Minergie standards were completely revised, a simplified verification procedure for retrofits introduced (Minergie Systemerneuerung), and, for the first time, products for the construction and operation phases (MQS Bau and MQS Betrieb) were developed.

Since 2017, the requirements for monitoring have been continuously evolved. Today, demand and consumption data for new Minergie buildings can be compared almost entirely automatically. In 2020, the PERFORMANCE product was added, offering a simple solution for operational optimization.

Also in 2020, the operational activities of the two associations GEAK (Cantonal Energy Performance Certificate for Buildings) and Minergie were merged. Since 2021, Minergie has also been responsible, within the framework of the “Swiss label family,” for the certification, marketing and training of SNBS (Standard Nachhaltiges Bauen Schweiz – Swiss Sustainable Building Standard).

Since 2022, the association has been headed by government councillor Fabian Peter. Today it has around 350 members and 1,500 professional partners. More than 30 employees work in its two offices in Basel and Sion, supported by the agency TicinoEnergia in Bellinzona. In recent years, the Minergie standards have maintained and even increased their strong significance in the Swiss market.

In 2025, the Minergie-Betrieb certificate was introduced. It ensures energy efficiency in ongoing building operation and recognizes owners who, through good management, avoid unnecessary energy consumption, greenhouse gas emissions, and excessive operating costs. The certificate was created in response to recurring criticism of the label, due to Minergie buildings consuming more energy than anticipated.

== Brand ==
The national trademark rights cover Switzerland, Liechtenstein, Mexico, Chile, Germany, and Japan and are registered with the DPMA. The international registration as an IR brand also covers the above-mentioned countries and is registered with WIPO.

== Building Standards and Add-on Products ==
The total energy demand of a Minergie building today is at least 20% lower than that of a conventional new building. With Minergie-P and Minergie-A, savings of up to 50% can be achieved. The standards were tightened again in autumn 2023, further reducing energy demand.

Today, Minergie certification includes different building standards as well as add-on products:

- Minergie Standard: the basis for climate-friendly building, aimed at clients and planners with above-average demands for comfort, efficiency, and climate protection. The energy and greenhouse gas balance is around 25% better than in a conventional new building.
- Minergie-P: stands for the optimal building envelope. It offers maximum energy efficiency and comfort and minimizes heating demand. Minergie-P buildings are particularly well suited for new construction.
- Minergie-A: represents today’s climate buildings, aiming for maximum independence and uncompromising climate protection. Greenhouse gas emissions are consistently minimized in both construction and operation, and over the course of a year the building (usually via PV modules) generates more energy than it consumes. Minergie-A demonstrates what is already feasible today on the path to net zero by 2050.
- Minergie-Areal: sets rules for the transformation of entire districts. These areas are characterized by stringent requirements for energy use, greenhouse gas emissions, and renewable-energy self-sufficiency. They also provide above-average heat protection and include guidelines for climate-adapted outdoor design and climate-friendly mobility.
- Systemerneuerung: offers a simple solution for high-quality energy retrofits based on five standard solutions and enables Minergie verification without complex calculations.
- Zusatz ECO: combined with any of the three Minergie standards, this add-on ensures healthy indoor climates, ecological building and circular-economy principles.
- MQS Bau: systematically controls and documents all Minergie-relevant building components, preventing construction defects.
- Minergie-Betrieb: ensures that Minergie buildings achieve their full potential for energy efficiency during operation, avoiding unnecessary energy use, excessive costs, and reducing greenhouse gas emissions (Scope 1 and 2).

== Certification ==
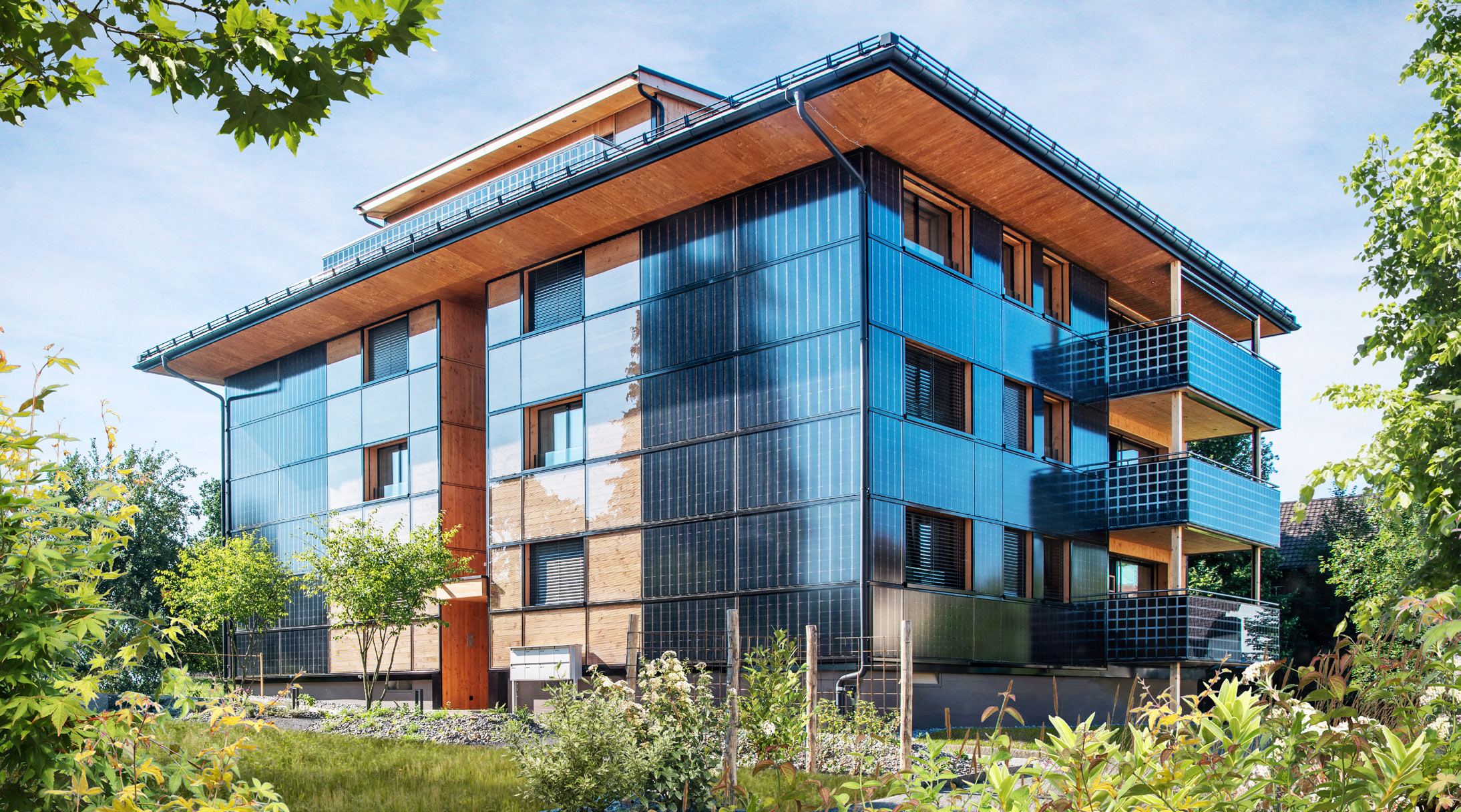
The apartment building in Fahrwahngen has been renovated in accordance with Minergie standards.

Certification is carried out by independent Minergie certification bodies authorized by the association. Their staff are qualified specialists in the relevant fields. This system ensures there are no conflicts of interest and that project submissions are reviewed objectively and to a high professional standard.

The certification process is divided into two phases:

1. Planning phase: calculations and plans are reviewed during building application; a provisional certificate is issued.
2. Completion phase: commissioning protocols and any project changes are reviewed; the final certificate is issued.

Random on-site inspections are also carried out during the construction process for some buildings.

All documents (regulations, guidelines, verification forms etc.) and certification fees are publicly available at www.minergie.ch.

== Recognition ==
With Minergie, clear standards for heating energy use in buildings were created for the general public. In addition to ecological benefits, the required insulation leads to higher surface temperatures. Together with improved airtightness and comfort ventilation, this results in improved comfort and better protection against external noise and moisture damage. Reliable protection against mould also provides significant health benefits.

Energy savings are substantial: a Minergie building consumes significantly less energy than the average building. From the outset, the standard was designed as a pragmatic, rolling instrument oriented towards the state of the art, with broad impact. Already in 1997, Uebersax and Kriesi defined a reduction path that positioned Minergie-P in 2001 to promote technical progress. In 2005, the ecobau standard was adapted to Minergie, creating Minergie-ECO, which added health and ecological aspects.

Since 2023, entire districts can also be certified as Minergie-Areal. These are characterized by stringent requirements for energy use, greenhouse gas emissions, renewable self-sufficiency, heat protection, outdoor climate adaptation, and sustainable mobility.

== Certified Buildings ==
In Switzerland, around one in five new buildings today is certified to a Minergie standard.

Well-known retrofitted Minergie buildings include:

- Migros headquarters high-rise, Zurich
- Former UBS office tower, now Zurich city administration, Werd building
- Former Swissair headquarters, Balsberg, Zurich-Kloten
- PlusEnergy building in Fahrwangen (2022)

Notable Minergie new builds include:

- SOL-ARCH² – first plus-energy single-family house in Minergie-P-ECO, Matten bei Interlaken
- Swiss Life Arena
- The Circle, Zurich Airport
- Inselspital, Bern (Anna-Seiler-Haus)
- BCF Arena, Fribourg
- Fischermätteli Quarter, first officially certified Minergie-Areal
- Raiffeisen headquarters, Savosa
- Messehalle 1, Basel
