= Green Power Usage Effectiveness =

Green Power Usage Effectiveness (GPUE) is a proposed measurement of both how much sustainable energy a computer data center uses, its carbon footprint per usable kilowatt hour (kWh) and it uses its power; specifically, how much of the power is actually used by the computing equipment (in contrast to cooling and other overhead). It is an addition to the power usage effectiveness (PUE) definition and was first proposed by Greenqloud.

The Green Grid has developed the Power Usage Effectiveness metric or PUE to measure a data centers' effectiveness of getting power to IT equipment. What the PUE tells in simple terms is how much extra energy is needed for each usable kWh for the IT equipment due to the power going into cooling, power loss etc. and it's a simple formula (in theory):

PUE = Total Facility Power/IT Equipment Power

The PUE can change depending on where measurements are made, when they are made and the timespan the measurements are made in. Data centers are subtracting factors from their PUE to lower it e.g. district heating. Some of the issues with PUE are being addressed with the PUEx definition.

GPUE is a way to "weigh" the PUE to better see which data centers are truly green in the sense that they indirectly cause the least amount of CO_{2} to be emitted by their use of sustainable or unsustainable energy sources.

This new metric GPUE or Green Power Usage Effectiveness is defined as:

GPUE = G × PUEx (for inline comparison of data centers)
or = G @ PUEx (a better display and for CO_{2} emission calculations)

The "G" is the key factor here and it is a simple calculated value:

G = Weighed sum of energy sources and their lifecycle KG CO_{2}/KWh

G =Σ( %EnergySource × ( 1 + weight) )

P Example:

PUE 1.20, 50/50 Coal/Hydro
G = 0.5*(1+1.050) + 0.5*(1+0.013)
G = 1.531, GPUEx = 1.84 or 1.531@1.20

Kg CO_{2} per usable kWh = (G-1) × PUEx = 0.64 kg

== See also ==
- Power usage effectiveness (PUE)
- Life-cycle greenhouse gas emissions of energy sources
- Data center infrastructure efficiency
- Performance per watt
- Green computing
- IT energy management
