= Server farm =

Collection of computer servers

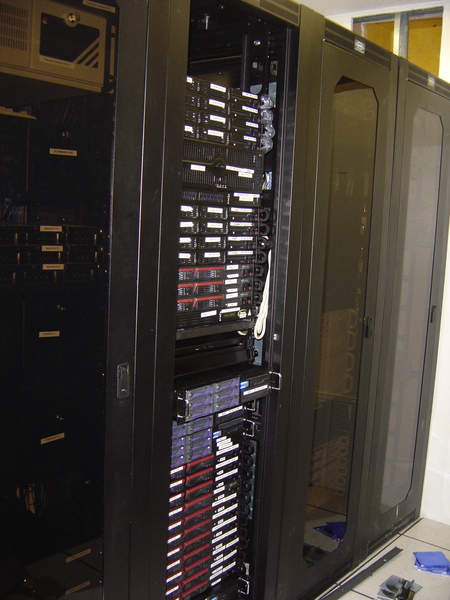
A row of racks in a server farm

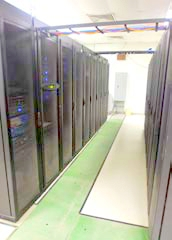
This server farm supports the various computer networks of the Joint Task Force Guantanamo.

A server farm or server cluster is a collection of computer servers, usually maintained by an organization to supply server functionality far beyond the capability of a single machine. They often consist of thousands of computers which require a large amount of power to run and to keep cool. At the optimum performance level, a server farm has enormous financial and environmental costs. They often include backup servers that can take over the functions of primary servers that may fail. Server farms are typically collocated with the network switches and/or routers that enable communication between different parts of the cluster and the cluster's users. Server "farmers" typically mount computers, routers, power supplies and related electronics on 19-inch racks in a server room or data center.

== Applications ==
Server farms are commonly used for cluster computing. Many modern supercomputers comprise giant server farms of high-speed processors connected by either Ethernet or custom interconnects such as Infiniband or Myrinet. Web hosting is a common use of a server farm; such a system is sometimes collectively referred to as a web farm. Other uses of server farms include scientific simulations (such as computational fluid dynamics) and the rendering of 3D computer generated imagery (see render farm).

Server farms are increasingly being used instead of or in addition to mainframe computers by large enterprises. In large server farms, the failure of an individual machine is a commonplace event: large server farms provide redundancy, automatic failover, and rapid reconfiguration of the server cluster.

== Performance ==
The performance of the largest server farms (thousands of processors and up) is typically limited by the performance of the data center's cooling systems and the total electricity cost rather than by the processors' performance. Computers in server farms run 24/7 and consume large amounts of electricity. For this reason, the critical design parameter for both large and continuous systems tends to be performance per watt rather than cost of peak performance or (peak performance / (unit ⋅ initial cost)). Also, for high availability systems that must run 24/7 (unlike supercomputers that can be power-cycled to demand, and also tend to run at much higher utilizations), there is more attention to power-saving features such as variable clock-speed and the ability to turn off both computer parts, processor parts, and entire computers (WoL and virtualization) according to demand without bringing down services. The network connecting the servers in a server farm is also an essential factor in overall performance, especially when running applications that process massive volumes of data.

=== Performance per watt ===
The EEMBC EnergyBench, SPECpower, and the Transaction Processing Performance Council TPC-Energy are benchmarks designed to predict performance per watt in a server farm. The power used by each rack of equipment can be measured at the power distribution unit. Some servers include power tracking hardware so the people running the server farm can measure the power used by each server. The power used by the entire server farm may be reported in terms of power usage effectiveness or data center infrastructure efficiency.

According to some estimates, for every 100 watts spent on running the servers, roughly another 50 watts is needed to cool them. For this reason, the siting of a server farm can be as important as processor selection in achieving power efficiency. Iceland, which has a cold climate all year as well as cheap and carbon-neutral geothermal electricity supply, is building its first major server farm hosting site. Fibre optic cables are being laid from Iceland to North America and Europe to enable companies there to locate their servers in Iceland. Other countries with favorable conditions, such as Canada, Finland, Sweden and Switzerland, are trying to attract cloud computing data centers. In these countries, heat from the servers can be cheaply vented or used to help heat buildings, thus reducing the energy consumption of conventional heaters.

== See also ==
- Blade server
- Compile farm
- Data center
- Geoplexing
- Green computing
- Link farm
- PS3 cluster
- Render farm
