= Water usage effectiveness =

Sustainability metric for datacenters

Water Usage Effectiveness (WUE) is a sustainability metric created by The Green Grid in 2011 to measure the amount of water used by datacenters to cool their IT assets.

== Definition ==
$\mathrm{WUE} = { \mbox{Water quantity} \over \mbox{IT Equipment Energy} }$

The unit is $L/kWh$, or, equivalently, $m^3/MWh$.

The standard ISO/IEC 30134-9:2022 gives more context for accurate measure, as well as specific WUE categories and various WUE derivatives.

== Typical values ==
The WUE is a positive number. It can be 0 L/kWh (with air cooling) or up to 2.5 L/kWh (with evaporative cooling).

Facebook published a WUE of 0.22 L/kWh for their datacenter of Prineville, Oregon for the second quarter of 2012.

For the year 2025 Equinix reports a global WUE of 0.91 L/kWh for all their datacenters, and a WUE of 1.41 L/kWh for sites using evaporative cooling.

== Other metrics ==
WUE is less widespread than the Power usage effectiveness (PUE), but is becoming more publicized by data center operators due to ESG considerations and/or due to water scarcity.

According to Equinix, PUE and WUE are partially opposites: with evaporative cooling the WUE increases and the PUE decreases, and with air cooling the WUE decreases (or is zero) but the PUE increases. The cooling technology of a given datacenter may be dependent on the region (and other considerations), and may be a mix of different technologies, possibly activated differently depending on the season.

A 2025 study found that water consumption per data center computing workload can differ by more than 10,000 times. Factors include server efficiency and utilization, electricity generation, and cooling technology. The study also highlighted limitations of conventional water usage effectiveness metrics, which do not account for differences in computing workloads and therefore may not provide a complete comparison of water efficiency across data centers.

== See also ==
- Power usage effectiveness (PUE)
- Data center infrastructure efficiency
- Performance per watt
- Green power usage effectiveness
- Green computing
- IT energy management
