= Green data center =

Server facility with energy-efficient technologies

123Net Datacenter walkway in Southfield, Michigan

A green data center, or sustainable data center, is a service facility which utilizes energy-efficient technologies. They do not contain obsolete systems (such as inactive or underused servers), and take advantage of newer, more efficient technologies.

With the exponential growth and usage of the Internet, power consumption in data centers has increased significantly. Due to the resulting environmental impact, increase in public awareness, higher cost of energy and legislative action, increased pressure has been placed on companies to follow a green policy. For these reasons, the creation of sustainable data centers has become essential in an environmental and a business sense.

== Energy use ==
The use of high-performance computing techniques has increased, trading energy consumption for increased performance. Industry estimates suggest that data centers consume three to five percent of the world's global energy. According to an AFCOM State of the Data Center survey, 70 percent of data-center providers indicated that power density per rack has increased significantly since 2013. Managers have been forced to find new ways to power their data centers with renewable energy sources such as hydro, solar, geothermal, and wind. More efficient technologies were developed to decrease data-center power consumption.

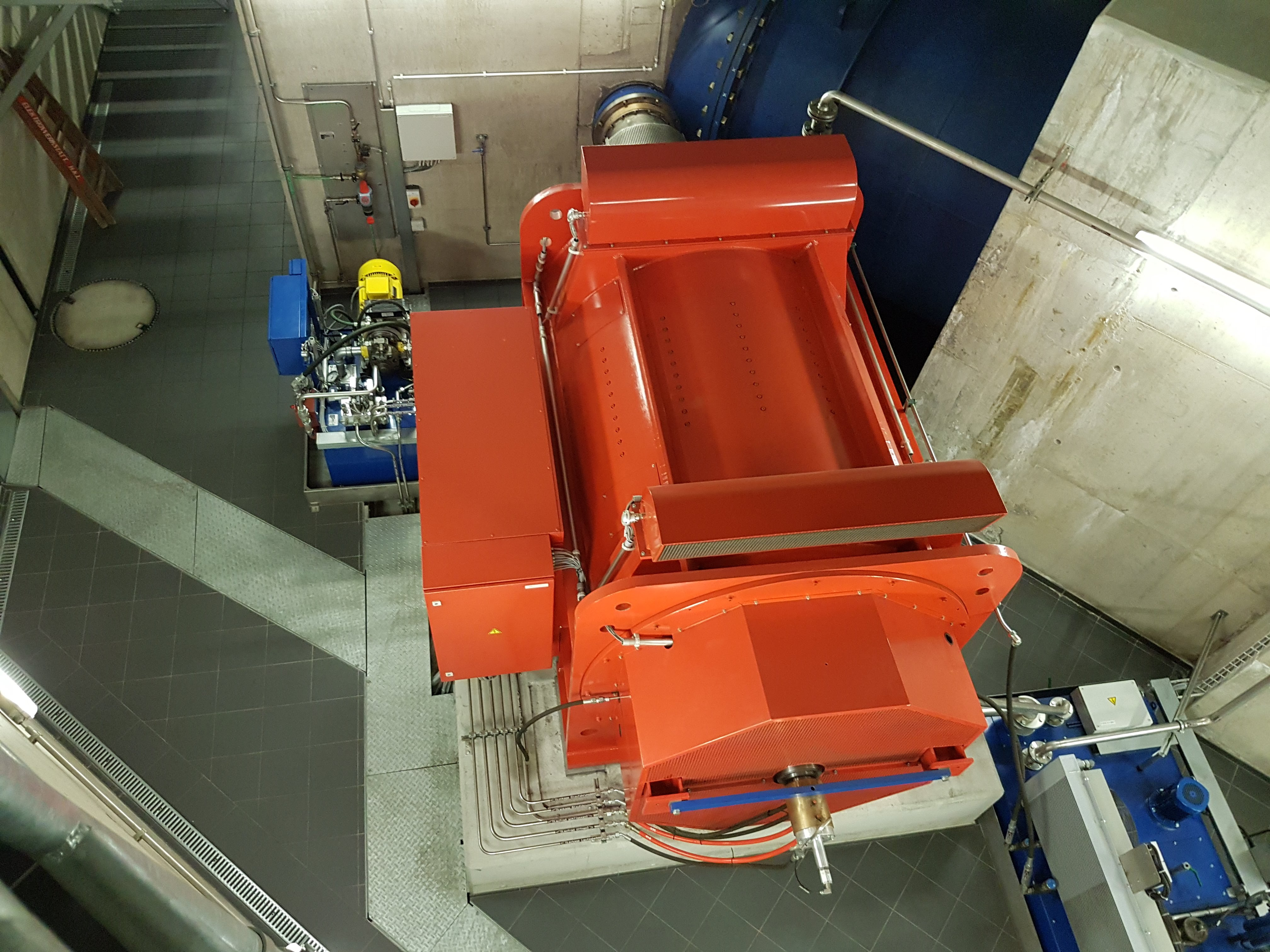
Hydropower generator in Data Center Light, Switzerland

== Metrics ==
Several metrics have been developed to measure power efficiency in data centers. Power usage effectiveness (PUE) and carbon usage effectiveness (CUE) are two frequently-used metrics created by the Green Grid (TGG), a global consortium dedicated to advancing energy efficiency in data centers.

=== Power usage effectiveness ===
PUE was invented in 2007, and proposed new guidelines to measure energy use in data centers.

$$\mathrm{PUE}  =  {\mbox{Total Facility Power} \over \mbox{IT Equipment Power}}$$

This ratio describes how much extra energy a data center needs to maintain IT equipment for every watt delivered to the equipment. The best PUE a data center can have is 1: an ideal situation, with no extra energy use. When PUE was introduced, studies found that the industry-average PUE was between 2.5 and 3. In more recent studies, the average PUE fell to about 1.7 by using this framework. PUE began the shift of the data-center industry towards energy efficiency.

PUE	1.2	1.5	2	2.5	3
Efficiency level	Very efficient	Efficient	Average	Inefficient	Very inefficient

Although PUE is the most-frequently-used metric for data centers to measure energy efficiency, its reliability is still debated;

=== Carbon usage effectiveness ===
Carbon usage effectiveness (CUE) is another metric used to measure energy usage and sustainability in data centers. Carbon Usage Effectiveness (CUE) measures the carbon dioxide emissions associated with a data center relative to the energy consumed by its IT equipment. Developed by The Green Grid, it is used to assess the carbon efficiency of data center operations. Lower CUE values indicate lower carbon emissions per unit of IT energy consumption. It is calculated with the following formula:

$$\mathrm{CUE}  =  \frac{Total \rm{CO_2} Emissions Caused}{IT Equipment Power}$$

Another way to express this formula is as the product of the carbon dioxide emission factor (CEF) and the PUE, where the CEF is the kg of $\ce{CO2}$ produced for each kilowatt-hour of electricity:

$\mathrm{CUE} = \frac{\rm{CO_2} emitted (kg\rm{CO_2}eq)}{unit of energy (kWh)}$ × $\frac{Total Facility Power}{IT Equipment Power}$

=== Water usage effectiveness ===
Water Usage Effectiveness (WUE) is a sustainability metric created by The Green Grid in 2011 to measure the amount of water used by datacenters to cool their IT assets.

== Certifications ==
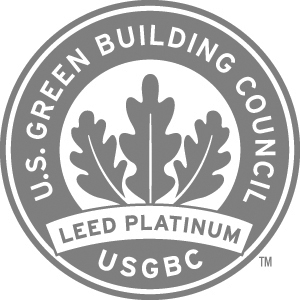
LEED platinum certification

Energy Star

Data centers in the United States may apply to be certified as green data centers. The most widely used green building rating system is the Leadership in Energy and Environmental Design (LEED). Developed by the U.S. Green Building Council, it is available in several categories. Depending on ratings, data centers may receive a silver, gold or platinum certification. The platinum certification is given to data centers with the highest level of environmentally-responsible construction and efficient use of resources.

Data centers may also be certified under the National Data Center Energy Efficiency Information Program by Energy Star, part of an initiative by the U.S. Environmental Protection Agency and the U.S. Department of Energy. The program certifies buildings and consumer products for energy efficiency. Only data centers which are in the top 25 percent in energy performance may receive Energy Star certification.

== Technologies ==
Several technologies increase efficiency and decrease energy consumption in data centers.

=== Low-power servers ===
Low-power servers are more energy-efficient than conventional servers in data centers. They use the technology of smartphone computing, which tries to balance performance with energy consumption. The first low-power servers were introduced in 2012 by large IT providers such as Dell and Hewlett-Packard. Used correctly, low-power servers can be much more efficient than conventional servers. They can have a significant impact on data-center efficiency, decreasing power consumption and the operating cost of cooling facilities.

=== Modular data centers ===
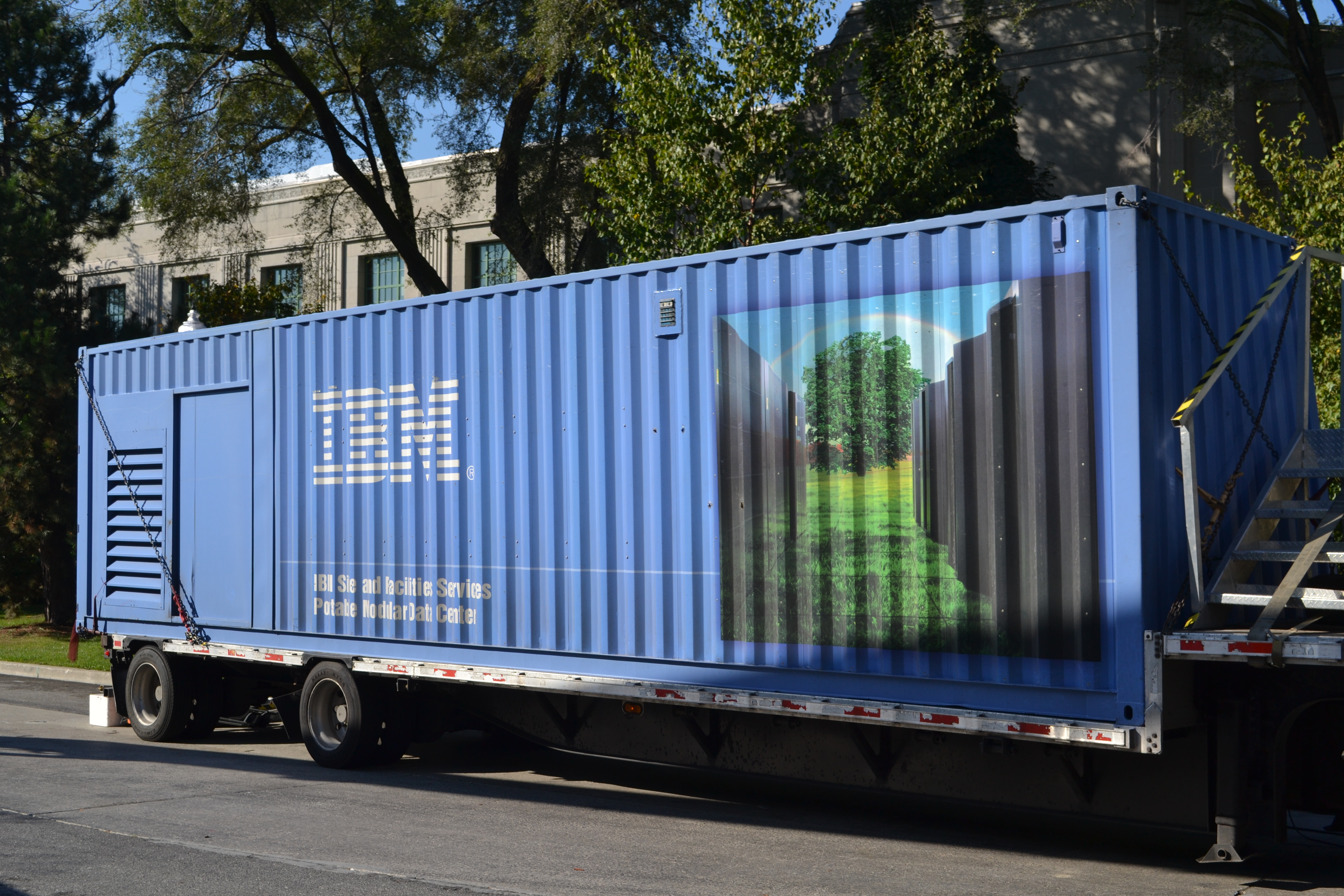
IBM modular data center

A modular data center is a portable data center which can be placed anywhere data capacity is needed. Compared with traditional data centers, they are designed for rapid deployment, energy efficiency and high density. These ready-made data centers in a box became very popular. The HP EcoPod modular data center supports over 4,000 data centers with a PUE rating of 1.05 in and free-air cooling.

=== Free air cooling ===
Schematic drawing of server racks with and without cold aisle containment (1) circulating air-cooling device (2) cold aisle (3) server racks (4) warm aisle (5) barrier between cold and warm aisles. Blue lines: flow of cold air; red lines: flow of warm air

Free air cooling systems uses external wind instead of traditional data-center computer room air conditioner (CRAC) units. Although outdoor air still needs to be filtered and moisturized, much less energy is required to cool a data center with this method. Outdoor air temperature is an issue here, and the data center's location plays a critical role in this technology.

=== Hot and cold aisle containment ===
In this method, the rows of racks are aligned with the backs of the servers facing each other; the aisles are enclosed, to capture the air. In hot aisle containment, the heat produced by the servers is pumped to the cooling units. In cold aisle containment, cold air is pumped to the enclosed aisles. Both containment methods are more effective than traditional cooling technologies, and can help reduce energy consumption (and its impact). Although it may be more difficult to implement, hot aisle containment is more effective than cold aisle containment.

=== Reusing waste heat ===
Data centers use electric power, releasing more than 98 percent of this electricity as heat. Waste heat can be actively reused, and a data center becomes a closed-loop heating system with no waste. Examples include:

- The IBM Reusing Data Center in Switzerland, where the heat warms a local swimming pool
- In Finland, the Yandex and Academica data centers replacing the heat used by 500-1,000 homes with data-center energy.
- Amazon reused heat from a nearby data center for a biosphere project in Seattle.

=== Ultrasonic humidification ===
Some humidity is necessary for data centers to work efficiently and prevent damage to devices and servers. Ultrasonic humidification uses ultrasound to create moisture, using 90 percent less energy than conventional methods such as resistance steam humidifiers.

=== Evaporative cooling ===
Evaporative cooling reduces heat by the evaporation of water. Two main methods are used: evaporation pads and high-pressure spray systems. With evaporation pads – the more popular method – air is drawn through the pads, making water evaporate and cooling the air. The other technique, high-pressure spray systems, needs a larger area and consumes more energy with pumps. Evaporative cooling is dependent on geographical location and season, because both affect the moisture level of the air. Compared to traditional mechanical cooling systems, evaporative cooling generally uses significantly less electricity.

=== Nuclear Power ===
Tech companies are increasingly exploring nuclear power as a reliable, low-carbon energy solution for data centers. As data consumption rises, the need for stable, scalable power sources is growing, and nuclear energy offers a consistent output that can support the high demand of large-scale data centers. Companies like Microsoft have started investigating the potential of nuclear energy, including small modular reactors (SMRs), to reduce their carbon footprints while ensuring energy reliability. However, challenges such as high costs, regulatory hurdles, and public concerns about safety and waste management continue to be significant considerations for widespread adoption .

=== Direct current data centers ===
Direct current data centers are data centers that produce direct current on site with solar panels and store the electricity on site in a battery storage power station. Computers run on direct current and the need for inverting the AC power from the grid would be eliminated. The data center site could still use AC power as a grid-as-a-backup solution. DC data centers could be 10% more efficient and use less floor space for inverting components.

=== Investment in Green Data Center ===
According to a new study by Arizton Advisory & Intelligence, the total investment in the green data center market across the globe marked $35.58 billion in 2021. The investment is expected to grow by a CAGR of 7.6%.

Biodegradable electrical components are the result of sustainable technical advancements. These parts are made to break down organically, which lessens the impact on the environment and electronic waste. Incorporating biodegradable materials into data center gear supports more sustainable data center operations and is in line with green computing aspirations.
