= Deep Freeze =

Deep Freeze may refer to:

== Entertainment ==
- Deep Freeze (film), a 2003 horror film
- Deep Freeze (video game), a 1999 PlayStation video game
- "Deep Freeze" (song), a song by Rina Aiuchi
- "Deep Freeze", a song from the album Urban Hymns by The Verve
- "Deep Freeze" (Batman: The Animated Series), a 1994 television show episode
- "Deep Freeze", an episode of CSI: Miami
- "The Deep Freeze", an episode of the animated television series Xiaolin Showdown

== Other uses ==
- Deep or Big Freeze, a purported cooling effect of the expanding universe
- Deep Freeze Range, a mountain range in Antarctica
- Deep freezer, a stand-alone freezer unit for preserving food
- Operation Deep Freeze, a series of American expeditions to Antarctica beginning in 1955
- Deep Freeze, a kernel-level software utility by Faronics

== See also ==
- John Friesz (born 1967), American former National Football League quarterback nicknamed "Deep"
