= De Leo =

De Leo is a surname.

People named De Leo or DeLeo include:

- Chase De Leo, American hockey player
- Diego De Leo, Italian academic
- Emilio De Leo, Italian association football manager
- Francesco De Leo, Italian businessman
- Dean DeLeo, American musician
- James DeLeo, American politician
- Robert DeLeo, American musician
- Stefanie DeLeo, American writer
