= Wakame-vdc =

Hypervisor

Wakame-VDC
- Developer: Wakame Software Foundation
- Release: 10.04 2010-04
- Stable release: 16.1.0 / 2 October 2015; 10 years ago
- Written in: Ruby
- Operating system: Linux
- Platform: Hypervisors (KVM, VMware ESXi) / Containers (LXC, OpenVZ)
- Available in: English / Japanese
- Type: Public / Private cloud computing
- License: LGPL v3.0
- Website: github.com/axsh/wakame-vdc/
- Repository: github.com/axsh/wakame-vdc

Wakame-vdc is an IaaS (Infrastructure as a Service) cloud computing framework, facilitating the provisioning and management of a heterogeneous virtualized infrastructure. Wakame-vdc virtualizes the entire data center; servers, storage, and networking. Wakame-vdc is managed via a native Web Interface, the Wakame-vdc CLI, or the powerful Wakame-vdc API.

Wakame-vdc is Datacenter Level Hypervisor, and gives the infrastructure higher portability. Since it is fully Open Sourced, with Wakame-vdc it is easy to design and extend the datacenter. Wakame-vdc provides the best method to build the cloud infrastructure.

== Goal ==
Wakame-vdc allows the administrator to spend less time managing the entire data center infrastructure.

Wakame-vdc strives to provide the same experience to the entire data center, as virtual machines have done for operating systems. The VDC (Virtual Data Center) offers virtualized facilities such as servers, storage, and networking, in what can be described as a data center level hypervisor. Deployment, migration and backup of a Wakame-vdc installation can freely be replicated between any site running Wakame-vdc, with minimal reconfiguration.

== Users ==
- KYOCERA Communication Systems Co., Ltd. - GreenOffice Unified Cloud
- NTT PC Communications Incorporated. - WebARENA VPS Cloud (Public Cloud Service)
- Kyushu Electric Power Co., Inc. - Private Cloud
- National Institute of Informatics - Private Cloud

== Functions ==
- Hypervisor (KVM, VMware ESXi, LXC, OpenVZ)
- Flexible Instance Specification Management
- Pluggable scheduler
- Software load balancing (Stud + HAProxy)
- Storage (tgtd, ZFS, Indelible FS)
- SSH key pair management
- Instance backup
- GUI / Web API (RESTful)
- Transferring image between DCs
- Management command-line interface
- Dynamic assigned external IP address
- Virtual networking (OpenFlow, multi-tenanted L3 network, distributed firewall)

== See also ==
- OpenVNet
- Amazon EC2
- GreenQloud
- OpenNebula
- OpenStack
- Cloud computing
