= Verdiem =

American software corporation

- Company type: Private
- Industry: Computer software
- Founded: 1 January 2001
- Fate: Acquired by Aptean
- Headquarters: Seattle
- Key people: John Scumniotales (CEO)
- Products: Surveyor 6
- Website: Aptean.com

Verdiem was a software corporation based in Seattle, Washington, USA. The company was backed by venture capital. The company was acquired by Aptean on January 12, 2015.

Verdiem produced the Surveyor enterprise-class PC power management software. Surveyor enabled customers to centrally control and reduce the energy used by PCs, Macs, and network devices running Cisco EnergyWise without affecting end users.

== Surveyor ==
Surveyor was Verdiem's enterprise class PC power management software. The product allowed the central administration of power management settings for networked PCs. Later releases included a Sustainability Dashboard.

== Case study ==
A Salix report contrasted similar sized (3,500) PowerMAN and Verdiem projects at the University of Sussex and the University of the West of England with payback periods of 0.5 and 2.5 years respectively.
