= Green Challenge =

Green Challenge may refer to

- Green Comm Challenge
- Michelin Green X Challenge, a part of the American Le Mans Series
- SK Golf Challenge, which was to be known as Green Challenge prior to its cancellation in 2010
- World Green Challenge
