= WUE =

WUE may refer to:

- Water usage effectiveness
- Windows Ultimate Extras
- Western Undergraduate Exchange
