= Emerald Program =

The SNIA Emerald Program Power Efficiency Measurement Specification, is a storage specification developed and maintained by the Storage Networking Industry Association (SNIA) and cross-referenced by the Environmental Protection Agency’s EnergyStar program. The specification consists of a storage types taxonomy, system under test workload and energy measurement method, measured metrics for active and idle operational states, and presence tests for capacity optimization technologies. The measured metric data is generated through the use of well-defined standard testing and data reduction procedures prescribed in the SNIA Emerald Specification.

SNIA's ongoing collaboration with the EPA has helped to shape the Energy Star Data Center Storage (DCS) Specification. The EPA DCS specification cross-references the SNIA Emerald Specification as the test and measurement methodology.

== Links ==
- SNIA Emerald™ Program homepage provides information on power efficiency, product measurement results, training, etc. for storage systems Welcome to SNIA Emerald | SNIA
- SNIA Green Storage Initiative homepage provides information about energy efficiency and conservations for networked storage technologies www.snia.org/gsi
- European Code of Conduct for Energy Efficiency in Data Centre Code of Conduct for Energy Efficiency in Data Centres
- The Green Grid homepage – energy efficient IT The Green Grid
- 80 PLUS homepage and information about power supply energy efficiency CLEAResult Plug Load Solutions
- Transaction Processing Performance Council – includes power efficiency data TPC-Homepage V5
- Storage Performance Council – includes Energy Extension
- Standard Performance Evaluation Corporation – benchmarks for servers and other computer systems that include power efficiency

== Third Party References to SNIA Emerald ==
- EnergyStar references to SNIA Emerald Specification in Table 4 Data Center Storage Key Product Criteria
- Industry report reference to SNIA Emerald on Page 21
- Lot 9 study for EU, ICT best practices and procurement - reference to SNIA Emerald on Page 22
- Industry report and recommendation for ICT procurement directed at EMEA/EU - references to SNIA Emerald on Pages 10&11

== Related Industry Standards ==
- INCITS/ANSI ITS 39
- ISO/IEC SC 39 ISO/IEC JTC 1/SC 39 - Sustainability, IT & Data Centres
