= SPECvirt =

Type of computer server benchmarking tool

SPECvirt_sc2010 is a computer benchmark that evaluates the performance of a server computer for virtualization. It is available from the Standard Performance Evaluation Corporation (SPEC). It was introduced in July, 2010.

The SPECvirt_sc2010 benchmark measures the maximum number of workloads that a platform can simultaneously run while maintaining specific quality of service metrics. Each workload, called a tile, consists of a specific set of virtual machines.

In addition to generating results that show performance, the benchmark can also be used to generate performance per watt results.

The SPECvirt_sc2010 was not supported by SPEC from February 26, 2014 and its successor is SPECvirt_sc2013.

== See also ==
- Performance per watt
- VMmark
