= Faronics =

Canadian software company

Faronics Corporation
- Type: Private
- Industry: Computer software
- Founded: 1996
- Founder: Farid Ali
- Headquarters: Vancouver, British Columbia, Canada
- Number of employees: 100+
- Website: faronics.com

Faronics Corporation is a privately held software company with offices in: Vancouver, British Columbia, Canada; Pleasanton, California, United States; Singapore; and Bracknell, United Kingdom. Faronics develops computer software for multi-user IT environments.

Faronics products are predominantly used in educational institutions, libraries, healthcare facilities, and government agencies.

== History ==
Faronics was founded in 1996 by Farid Ali, the company's present CEO, and was incorporated in 1996. Faronics first sold computer hardware and shifted to software in 1999 with the advent of Deep Freeze, a kernel-level software utility that instantly restores a computer back to its original configuration with every reboot.

Deep Freeze has since-garnered a strong presence in K-12 education and is now part of Faronics "Layered Security" suite of products.

== Products ==
Faronics develops nine software products which run on Windows and Mac OS X operating systems:

=== Deep Freeze ===
Deep Freeze is a software utility, released in 1999, that restores a computer back to its original configuration each time the computer restarts. Deep Freeze comes in two versions for Windows (Standard for standalone computers and Enterprise for networked computers) and a version for Mac OS X (a version for SUSE Linux Enterprise Desktop (SLED) by Novell was discontinued in 2010). Deep Freeze for Windows can be managed remotely via its Enterprise Console or via Faronics Core. Deep Freeze Mac can be centrally-managed in multiple computer settings via Apple Remote Desktop.

Deep Freeze is a kernel-level driver that runs at a low system level to protect drive integrity. Running at this low system level allows the driver to redirect information which is being written to the drive, leaving the original data intact. This redirected information is no longer referenced once the computer is restarted, thus restoring the system to its original state at the disk sector level. To the computer user, the computing experience is unaffected when Deep Freeze is active.

For Deep Freeze to protect a computer's configuration, a computer must have its BIOS password-protected and have its hard disk as the first boot device.

=== Anti-Executable ===
Originally released in 2005 as FreezeX, Anti-Executable is an application whitelisting software that, when first installed, creates a "whitelist" of executable files which exists on a computer. When Anti-Executable is active, unwanted executables which do not appear on the whitelist will not run. Anti-Executable comes in two versions for Windows (Standard for standalone computers and Enterprise for networked computers). Anti-Executable Enterprise can be managed remotely via Faronics Core.

=== Faronics Anti-Virus ===
Released in 2010, this anti-virus software for Windows combines anti-virus, anti-spyware and anti-rootkit technologies. Faronics Anti-Virus works with Deep Freeze so that program updates can be performed without turning Deep Freeze protection off. Faronics Anti-Virus is managed remotely via Faronics Core.

=== Power Save ===
Released in 2007, Power Save provides PC power management to aid in green computing initiatives and to help reduce power expenses. Power Save monitors computer activity to avoid interfering with computers in use and produces reports which show power consumption savings. Power Save comes in versions for Windows and Mac OS X. Power Save for Windows can be managed remotely via Faronics Core. Power Save Mac can be monitored remotely via Faronics Core and centrally-managed via Apple Remote Desktop.

=== WINSelect ===
Released in 1997, WINSelect is a user environment management software that allows IT administrators to customize the operating system and application functionality of computers in public access, kiosk, library, educational, and corporate environments. WINSelect comes in two versions for Windows (Standard for standalone computers and Enterprise for networked computers). WINSelect Enterprise is managed remotely via Faronics Core.

=== System Profiler ===
System Profiler is an IT asset management software that can generate a detailed inventory of a computer workstation's hardware configuration and software installed in both a summary or report format. System Profiler comes in two versions for Windows (Standard for standalone computers and Enterprise for networked computers). System Profiler Enterprise is managed remotely via Faronics Core.

=== Faronics Core ===
A management tool, released in 2008, that centrally administers computer workstation deployments of certain Faronics software products. Faronics Core utilizes MMC3 (Microsoft Management Console) technology which can create customized groups of computer workstations, schedule software-related tasks, and create reports. Faronics Core manages Faronics Anti-Virus, the Enterprise versions of WINSelect, Anti-Executable, and System Profiler, and the Windows editions of Deep Freeze and Power Save. Computers with Power Save Mac installed can be monitored by Faronics Core for reporting purposes.

=== Device Filter Mac ===
A software security utility, released in 2007, that regulates peripheral devices connecting to Mac OS X desktop computers to prevent unauthorized data transfers or connections. Device Filter Mac can be centrally-managed in multiple computer settings via Apple Remote Desktop.

== Awards ==
2011
Government Computer News - 2011 Best of FOSE Award: Security Software - Deep Freeze
2010
Technology & Learning - 2010 Awards of Excellence, Best Upgrade - Deep Freeze, Power Save & Faronics Insight
2009
Technology & Learning - 2009 Awards of Excellence, Best Upgrade - Anti-Executable, Power Save & WINSelect
Scholastic Administer@tor – Best in Tech for Network Security, 2009 – WINSelect.
2008
District Administration – Readers' Choice Top 100 Products of 2008 – Deep Freeze.
Technology & Learning – 2008 Awards of Excellence, Faronics Insight and Deep Freeze (Legacy Winner).
2007
Technology & Learning – 2007 Awards of Excellence, Legacy Winner – Deep Freeze.
2006
Macworld – 22nd Annual Editors' Choice Awards – Deep Freeze Mac.
Technology & Learning – 2006 Awards of Excellence, Legacy Winner – Deep Freeze.
eSchool News – Readers’ Choice Awards 2006 Winner, Network and Administration Software – Deep Freeze (Windows & Mac).
2005
Media and Methods Magazine – Awards Portfolio 2005 Winner, Computer Security – Deep Freeze Enterprise.
2004
Technology & Learning – 2004 Awards of Excellence – Deep Freeze Enterprise.
2003
Technology & Learning – 2003 Awards of Excellence, Management and Security – Deep Freeze Professional.

== Affiliations and memberships ==
Faronics has been recognized by Energy Star and the Climate Savers Computing Initiative, the LANDesk Solutions Alliance and is a Microsoft Gold Certified Partner.

Faronics is also a member of the International Society for Technology in Education (ISTE), EDUCAUSE, British Columbia Technology Industry Association (BCTIA), the Consortium for School Networking (CoSN) and the Software and Information Industry Association (SIIA).

== See also ==
- Antivirus software
