= OpenVNet =

- Developer(s): Wakame Software Foundation
- Initial release: 0.7 June 4, 2015; 9 years ago
- Stable release: 0.9 / 19 April 2016; 8 years ago
- Repository: github.com/axsh/openvnet
- Written in: Ruby
- Operating system: Linux
- Available in: English / Japanese
- Type: Network virtualization
- License: LGPL v3.0
- Website: openvnet.org

The OpenVNet adds a Network Virtualization layer on top of the existing physical network and enables data center network administrators to tremendously simplify the creation and operation of multi-tenant networks. It is based on edge overlay network architecture and provides all the necessary components for network virtualization such as SDN controller, virtual switch, virtual router, and powerful APIs.

The OpenVNet project started in April 2013. Almost part of the implementation had already done in the Wakame-vdc project in the beginning of 2012.

== See also ==
- Open vSwitch
