= Francesco De Leo =

Italian business executive

Francesco de Leo is an Italian business executive in the field of Information and Communications Technology with a particular focus on issues relating to Green ICT.

One of the Young Global Leaders at the World Economic Forum of 1999, he is the Founder and Executive Chairman of Kaufmann & Partners (K&P), a London-based advisory company focused on telco, media, and corporate finance. In his role as Chairman of K&P, Francesco played a key role in supporting Cellnex Telecom in the acquisition of WIND's tower business, a transaction valued at 690 Million Euros for a portfolio of 7,737 towers.

== Education ==
Francesco De Leo received a BA in economics from Bocconi University in Milan, and a PhD in Strategy and Organization from UCLA Anderson School of Management. He is a graduate of CASD (Centro Alti Studi della Difesa).

== Career ==
He was Director at Graviton (La Jolla, California) from 2001 through 2004, a company in the field of wireless sensory networks.

From July 2005 through December 2008, Francesco De Leo served as Director for Business Development and International Affairs at Wind, the third largest mobile carrier and second largest fixed line telecom operator in Italy. He subsequently served as Chief Strategy Officer and Head of Business Development and Corporate Communications for Wind.

In January 2007, he was appointed vice-chairman of Tellas in Athens, Greece, the second largest fixed line operator in the country, where he merged the company with Wind Hellas at the end of 2008.

Before joining Wind, De Leo served as an executive director at IFIL-Exor, the financial holding company controlled by the Agnelli family, which owns, among others, FIAT Group, Worms, Cushman & Wakefield, and Juventus.

From January 2010 through July 2012, Francesco De Leo was a member of the Board of Directors of SIRTI, the leading Italian company in the field of telecom network rollout and management.

He was appointed managing director of Telecom Italia after its privatization, where he was in charge of R&D, M&A, International Operations and Strategy, and served as Chairman of STET International, and Stream (the digital TV platform of Telecom Italia). He was on the Board of Directors of TIM (Telecom Italia Mobile) and Finsiel. In this role, he fostered the international expansion of Telecom Italia through the acquisition of the third mobile license in Spain, the acquisition of Brasil Telecom and of 25% of Telekom Austria.

De Leo is co-founder and partner of Kaufmann Marczyk Capital Partners (KMCP), advising financial institutions in the field of asset management and portfolio selection. KMCP provides indices for assessing the sustainability of portfolios, funds, corporations and markets. The principal focus is on mitigating unexpected risks that are affecting asset allocation and portfolio management at large/diversified financial institutions. KMCP, together with Media Tenor, is working with the managing director of the United Nations HQs in Geneva, Michael Moller, at the launch of the Global Sustainability Index (GSI), backed by the Chairman of Deutsche Börse, Dr. Joachim Faber.

De Leo is also acting as President of European Operations for Prodea Systems, a Dallas-based company leading in the field of the “Internet of Things”. He is the Founder and the Executive Chairman of Green Comm Challenge, which focuses on investments in green technology in the US and Europe and a professor of Corporate Strategy at LUISS Guido Carli University in Rome.

He is currently serving as a member of the following Advisory Boards:

- GEO Capital, a leading investment bank with offices in Macao and Lisbon, founded by Jorge Ferro Ribeiro.
- Capgemini
- Telco, Media & Entertainment Advisory Board in London.
- Simtone, one of the leading providers of cloud computing solutions
