= PC power management =

Power management of personal computer hardware

PC power management refers to software-based mechanisms for controlling the power use of personal computer hardware. This is typically achieved through software that puts the hardware into the lowest power demand state available, making it an aspect of green computing.

A typical office PC uses about 90 watts when active (approximately 50 watts for the base unit, and 40 watts for a typical LCD screen), and three to four watts when asleep. Up to 10% of a modern office’s electricity demand can be due to PCs and monitors.

While most PCs allow low-power settings, there are frequently situations, especially in a networked environment, where processes running on the computer will prevent the low-power settings from taking effect. This can have an effect on energy use that is invisible to the user. Operational testing has shown that on any given day, an average of over 50% of an organization's computers will fail to go to sleep, and over long periods of time this affects over 90% of machines. This leads to most computers having the option of customizing power management systems and has created a market for third-party power management software to further control a computer’s power use.

== Windows 'Insomnia' (Sleepless PCs) ==
The Windows power management system is based on an idle timer. If the computer is idle for longer than the pre-set time, then the PC may be configured to sleep or 'hibernate'. Windows uses a combination of user activity and CPU activity to determine when the computer is idle.

Applications can temporarily inhibit this timer by using the 'SetThreadExecutionState' API. There are legitimate reasons why this may be necessary such as burning a DVD or playing a video. However, in many cases applications can unnecessarily prevent power management from lowering power demand. This is commonly known as Windows 'Insomnia' and can be a barrier to successfully implementing power management.

Common causes include:

- Legacy or non-power management-aware applications
- Open file handles on remote computers
- Faulty mice or mouse jigglers, which can cause cursor movement even though the user is not present.
- Scheduled maintenance tasks causing significant CPU activity
- High network activity

== Software solutions ==
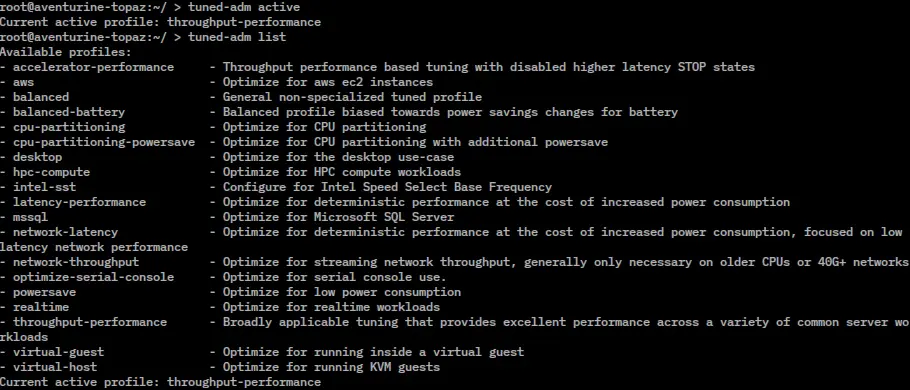
Screenshot of tuned-adm on openSUSE Tumbleweed, showing active power management profile and available power management profiles

Operating systems have built-in settings to control power use. Microsoft Windows supports predefined power plans and custom sleep and hibernation settings through a Control Panel Power Options applet. Apple's macOS includes idle and sleep configuration settings through the Energy Saver System Preferences applet. Likewise, Linux distributions include a variety of power management settings and tools.

There is a significant market in third-party PC power management software offering features beyond those present in the Windows operating system. Notable vendors Data Synergy's 'PowerMAN', Faronics' 'Power Save', and Verdiem's 'SURVEYOR'.

Some studies have suggested that power management tools can save on average 200 kg of CO_{2} emissions per PC per year and generate $36 per PC per year in energy savings.

== Comparison ==
The following tables compare technical information for a commercial PC power management software suites. Please see the individual products' articles for further information. The table only includes systems that are widely used and currently available.

Software	Data Synergy PowerMAN	Energy Star EZ GPO	Faronics Power Save	Verdiem Surveyor
License	Proprietary	Free	Proprietary	Proprietary
64-bit Support	Yes	No	Yes	Yes
Active Directory Integration	Yes	No	Yes	Yes
Group Policy Configuration Support	Yes	Yes	No	No
Per-user Policy	Yes	No	Yes	Yes
Per-machine Policy	Yes	Yes	Yes	Yes
Anti-insomnia	Yes	No	Yes	Yes
Sleep on idle	Yes	Yes	Yes	Yes
Hibernate on idle	Yes	Yes	Yes	Yes
Power-off on idle	Yes	No	Yes	Yes
Logout on idle	Yes	No	Yes	No
Standby display on idle	Yes	Yes	Yes	No
Scheduled Sleep/Hibernate	Yes	No	Yes	Yes
Scheduled power-off	Yes	No	Yes	Yes
Scheduled Reboot	Yes	No	Yes	Yes
Scheduled wake-up (without WoL)	Yes	No	Yes	Yes
Remote wake-up (with WoL)	Yes	No	Yes	Yes

== See also ==
- IT energy management
- Advanced Configuration and Power Interface
