= Geoplexing =

Geoplexing is a computer science term relating to the duplication of computer storage and applications within a server farm over geographically diverse locations for the purpose of fault tolerance. The name comes from a contraction of geographical multiplex.

== Description ==
In a geoplex, server clusters are duplicated over one or more geographically separate sites. Geoplexes can be "active-active" (where all of the clusters are used in tandem) or "active-passive" (where one or more of the clusters are kept as a hot spare).

Data and applications are shared either via cloning or partitioning. With cloning, each server in a cluster handles one or more applications, with the applications and the data both being cloned to other servers in the geoplex, and so a load balancer then distributes requests to the cloned servers. Meanwhile, with partitioning, hardware and applications are duplicated in the geoplex, while application datasets are divided between the servers, and therefore requests are routed to the appropriate server.
