= Qstack =

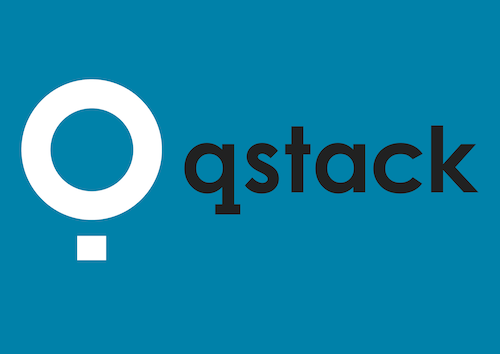
- Make IT Easy
- Developer: Greenqloud
- Release: 2015; 11 years ago
- Stable release: 16.07
- Operating system: Any virtualizable OS
- Website: www.qstack.com

Qstack is a cloud management platform developed by GreenQloud, a cloud computing software company founded in Reykjavik, Iceland in February 2010. Qstack enables its users to manage multiple clouds and hybrid deployments through a single self-service portal.

Qstack is in continuous development, incorporating developments within infrastructure, cloud, and application management solutions. The next release of Qstack is slated for June 2017.

== History ==
In 2014 when Jonsi Stefansson joined as CEO, Greenqloud pivoted its operational focus to development of Qstack with beta launch in the fall of 2015, and began offering support, technical services and certifications for the software.

== Features ==
Qstack is hypervisor agnostic (KVM, VMware, Hyper-V) and can manage private clouds in multiple locations as well as AWS, Azure, and EC2-compatible public clouds from its user interface. Qstack combines proprietary software with open-source components, and the company claims to harden them to meet the strict security standards often required by enterprise deployments. Qstack features VM templates for Windows, Linux, and other operating systems. It also features full SSH/RDP access to instances, virtual routers, firewalls, and load balancers built into the interface.

== Reception ==
In a 2015 review, IDG columnist J. Peter Bruzzese praised Qstack’s user interface for its ease-of-use and clean look.
