= Permacomputing =

Concept in sustainable computing

Permacomputing is a computing design philosophy which aims to improve resilience by using regenerative design in computer and network technology.

== History ==
The term permacomputing was coined by Finnish artist and writer Ville-Matias “Viznut’’ Heikkilä in an essay on their website, although it has earlier roots in a talk given by Kent Beck titled "Programming as a garden: Permaprogramming", as well as Amanda Starling Gould's 2017 doctoral dissertation on "Digital Environmental Metabolisms" which treats digital networking as a kind of geography.

== Principles ==
Permacomputing generally centers on a set of principles:

- Hope for the Best, Prepare for the Worst: designing for resilience even when you do not expect issues;
- Care for All Hardware — Especially the Chips: pay attention to the digital foundations of technology and aim to avoid producing waste;
- Observe First: assess what is valuable, beautiful, and necessary before taking action;
- Not Doing: do not assume that technological progress is necessarily beneficial;
- Expose The Seams: make the meaning, motivation, and materiality of software design tangible and visible;
- Consider Carefully The Interaction Between Simplicity, Complexity and Scale: do not assume that a simple system is necessarily better, and avoid scaling up for its own sake;
- Keep It Flexible: make systems adaptable to different purposes and circumstances;
- Build On Solid Ground: avoid becoming strongly dependent on systems, platforms, or formats that may change rapidly;
- (Almost) Everything has a place: avoid thinking of the history of technology as a linear story of progress and obsolescence, and value diversity;
- Integrate Biological And Renewable Resources: encourage the greater integration of computational resources with sustainable and renewable materials.

== Self-obviating systems ==
A design principle in line with permacomputing is the self-obviating system, which is a system which intends to render itself unnecessary. In this paradigm, abandonment of the technology does not represent failure; for example, users may abandon a digital exercise system because they move onto other forms of exercise, like running outdoors or attending a gym, so that the system becomes unnecessary to them.

== See also ==
- Hundred Rabbits, an art collective working in the tradition of permacomputing
- Solarpunk
