= Digital decarbonisation =

Impact of digital activities on the environment

Digital decarbonization is an approach to reducing the environmental impact of digital technologies, data practices and supporting infrastructure. It is used to describe efforts to measure and reduce emissions associated with data storage, transmission, processing, and the operation of digital systems, including cloud services, artificial intelligence (AI) and data centres.

The World Economic Forum has stated that experts at Loughborough University coined the term "digital decarbonization" to describe efforts to reduce the carbon footprint of digital activity. The term has also appeared in wider academic and institutional contexts, including maturity-model research and university sustainability strategy.
