= PowerMAN =

Systems management software for Microsoft Windows

- Developer: Data Synergy
- Initial release: 2008; 18 years ago
- Stable release: 5.6.0 / April 2025; 1 year ago
- Written in: C++
- Operating system: Windows
- Platform: IA-32, x86-64
- Available in: English
- Type: System monitoring
- License: Copyright
- Website: www.datasynergy.co.uk/products/powerman

PowerMAN is a computer software program for central system monitoring and PC power management, of computers running Microsoft Windows operating systems. The software extends the basic features present in most operating systems to permit implementing and enforcing organization-wide power management policies.

The product is used by private and public sector organisations in Europe, UK, and US. It includes a web-based, multi-location, reporting feature that can collate data from deployments in multiple countries.

The product is more common in the academic market, where it has been used by leading institutions to manage staff and student computers.

The software is produced by Data Synergy, based in Sheffield, UK. The firm is a member of the Climate Savers Computing Initiative.

== Features ==
PowerMAN allows different power management profiles to be configured for different users, computers, and times, using native Windows Active Directory tools. This simpler approach contrasts with many competing solutions that require new consoles or administration tools to be learnt. The reporting features collect information about each computer and can generate a variety of historic and live reports. The manufacturers claim that the combination of flexible management and reporting enhance the effectiveness of the solution.

== Research ==
PowerMAN has a background in the academic sector and has been used in several research projects:

- Liverpool University use PowerMAN to manage PC power use with the Condor High-Throughput Computing System. The Jisc funded SusteIT conference at the University of Sheffield included a presentation on PowerMAN by Liverpool University
- University of Nottingham estimated PowerMAN would save 600 tonnes/yr of CO_{2} and contribute over 4% to the University’s planned annual saving for 2015. The financial saving was estimated to be £325 per day.
- Sheffield NHS Teaching Hospitals reported that PC power management poses particular challenges in a hospital environment but using PowerMAN these problems could be overcome and save over £70,000 and 350 tonnes of CO_{2} per year.
- Iowa State University reported a realized savings period of 23 days and projected annual savings of $49,000 for 500 computers.
- University of Sussex implemented a PowerMAN project on 3,500 PCs using Salix funding and reported an estimated 203 tonnes CO_{2} saving with a project payback in around 6 months.
- The University of Leicester reported that around 379,500 kilowatt hours of savings were made in the first year. This was estimated to be approximately 5 million computer hours saved and estimated annual savings of 287 tonnes of CO_{2}.
- A Salix report contrasted similar sized (3,500) PowerMAN and Verdiem projects at the University of Sussex and the University of the West of England with payback periods of 0.5 and 2.5 years respectively.
- The University of East Anglia Sustainable ICT Service Provision project reported a decrease of up to 40% in PC energy costs. This equated to an average annual saving per PC of 269 kW·h and a reduction in running costs of £27 per year. The report concluded that when applied to all student IT areas this would reduce CO_{2} emissions by 188,111 kg and running costs by £35,496.
- The University of Oxford Low-carbon ICT Project conference 'Keeping IT Clean' studied a number of competitor PC power management products and included a university led case-study on PowerMAN
