= Deep Freeze (video game) =

1999 video game

- Developer: Talon Inc.
- Publisher: Sammy Corporation
- Producer: Yasushi Akimoto
- Designer: Yoshihide Andō
- Artist: Mototaka Nakatsu
- Writers: Hiroki Ikeda; Satsuo Endo
- Composer: Yō Tsuji
- Platform: PlayStation
- Release: JP: January 14, 1999
- Genres: Action-adventure; Third-person shooter
- Mode: Single-player

Deep Freeze (Note: Japanese: ディープフリーズ, Hepburn: Dīpufurīzu) is a 1999 action-adventure video game developed by Talon Inc. and published by Sammy for the PlayStation. The story focuses on a counter-terrorist unit known as INTER-ANTS (International Anti-terrorist Service).

== Gameplay ==
The game is set in 2001, when a terrorist organization known as Hephaestus has risen, with the aforementioned INTER-ANTS being formed as a response to combat them.

Deep Freeze is an action adventure game. All the characters act in teams. At the beginning of each mission, players can pick one of five characters who will play as a partner and provide cover fire. This computer-controlled partner can be controlled through simple commands.

The game features many weapons the player can choose from the start, including a shotgun, Uzi submachine gun, and magnum handgun. Players can also collect grenades in the game, which can flush out enemies hidden behind obstacles such as barrels. The player can also perform rolls, which allows them to dodge bullets from enemies.

Despite being released in Japan only, the game features English voice acting. However, all the menus in the game are in Japanese.

The game uses pre-rendered backgrounds and camera switching in a similar fashion to the game Resident Evil.

== Release ==
The game was shown at the 2000 Tokyo Games Show gaming convention in Japan. Deep Freeze was released on January 14, 1999, for the Sony PlayStation home console, and was published by Sammy. The game was re-released on July 19, 2000, in the SuperLite 1500 budget line of games. The game has never been released outside of Japan, nor has it ever been released on the PlayStation Network game archives either.

== Reception ==
Reception

Review scores
Publication	Score
Famitsu	26/40
Gamers' Republic	C
Mega Fun	78/100
Super Gamepower	4/5
Video Games	75/100
Ação Games	9.2/10
Joypad	4/10
Gamers	3.7/5

The game received mostly positive reviews upon release. Famitsu gave the game a score of 26 out of 40. Ralph Karels writing in the German video game magazine Video Games gave it a 75 out of 100. He recommended the game for fans of Resident Evil series, and those who like import games. However, he cautioned that knowledge of Japanese is needed to complete the game because the menus are in Japanese. Super Gamepower gave it a score of 4 out of 5 in all categories (sound, graphics, fun, control) and an overall score of 4 out of 5. The writer described the game as like Resident Evil, with more action and shooting but less blood and gore.

Mega Fun gave it a 78.

Gamers' Republic gave the game a score of C and was rather critical of it. The writer says that the mixture of fast action and pre-rendered backgrounds does not mix and causes disorientation. The writer explained that such a format worked for Resident Evil since it was slower paced, it doesn't work in Deep Freeze. Also, the writer commented on the voice acting, calling it "horrendous" and said the enemy AI was too passive for simply standing there while the player reloaded.
