= GreenQloud =

Cloud computing software company

Greenqloud
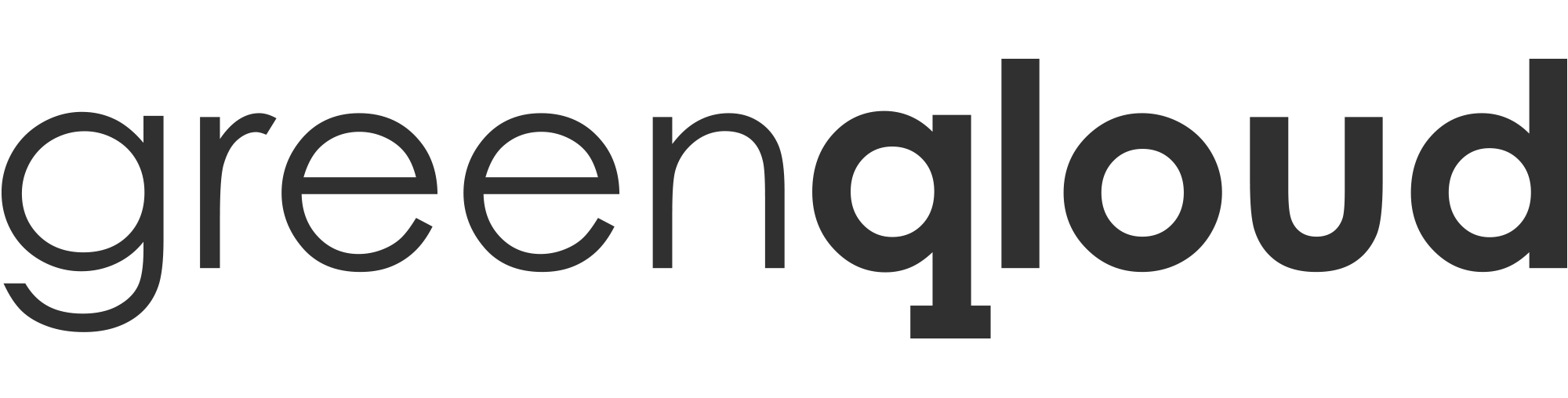
- Type: Private
- Industry: Computer Software
- Genre: Cloud infrastructure
- Founded: Reykjavík, Iceland (2010)
- Founder: Eirikur Hrafnsson; Tryggvi Larusson
- Headquarters: Reykjavík, Iceland
- Key people: Jonsi Stefansson (CEO)
- Products: Qstack
- Number of employees: < 50
- Divisions: Cloud Software
- Website: www.qstack.com

Greenqloud is a cloud computing software company with headquarters in Reykjavik, Iceland, and office in Seattle, Washington, offering cloud computing software and services. Greenqloud develops and sells the cloud and infrastructure management software Qstack for the global market.

== History ==
Founded in 2010, the company initially sold public cloud computing services, such as web hosting and data storage, marketed as infrastructure as a service (IaaS), powered by data centers using 100% renewable energy in Iceland. Most hosting companies buy carbon offset credits as a green marketing measure, and host data at multiple data centers on different continents as the solution for international sites.

Early on, Greenqloud began building upon the software startup cloud.com, which later became Apache CloudStack. When Jonsi Stefansson joined as CEO in 2014 the company was pivoted to a pure software company with 100% focus on building and developing the cloud management platform Qstack. In 2015 the company released Qstack, to be deployed on private and hybrid environments.

In 2016, Qstack already supported leading hypervisors, including VMware, KVM and Hyper-V and bare metal provisioning. In early 2017, Qstack will add container-based Application Orchestration support with an integrated Kubernetes server, allowing its users the ability deploy microservices and workloads on scalable clusters.

In 2017, GreenQloud was acquired by NetApp.

In 2026, NetApp closed its offices in Iceland.

== News coverage ==
- Iceland's GreenQloud To Kill Its Public Cloud, Support Others Instead
- Greenqloud Bucks The Post-PRISM Trend, Shame About The Headware
- Google, Facebook and Apple lead on green data centers
- Greenqloud goes Hybrid
- NetApp Bought Iceland's Greenqloud To Fill Data Fabric Need For Cloud Automation, Orchestration
