= Green Comm Challenge =

Green Comm Challenge

Green Communication Challenge is an organization founded and led by Francesco De Leo that promotes the development of energy conservation technology and practices in the field of Information and Communications Technology (ICT). Green Comm Challenge achieved worldwide notoriety in 2007, when it enlisted as one of the challengers in the 33rd edition of the America's Cup, an effort meant to show how researchers, technologists and entrepreneurs from around the world can be brought together by an exciting vision: building the ultimate renewable energy machine, a competitive America’s Cup boat.

== The Challenge ==
ICT is helping society become more energy efficient: think of the positive impact on CO_{2} emissions of telecommuting and ecommerce for example. Computers are helping us design more energy efficient products. But there is little doubt that, while other industries strive to become more energy efficient, computers and networks themselves risk becoming the “energy hogs” of the future, unless something is done.

Powering the over 1 billion personal computers, the millions of corporate data centers, the over 4 billion fixed and mobile telephones and telecommunications networks around the world requires approximately 1.4 Petawatt-hr a year (1.4×10^{15} W-hr) of electricity, approximately 8% of the global electrical energy produced in 2005. And consider that over 4 billion people around the world have never used a cell phone, almost three times as many as those who currently have access to one.

Some estimates project that the above percentage will grow to 15% by 2020, but these projections may fail to take into account some of the disruptive trends we are witnessing today. Take Google for example: to power the over 75 billion searches performed in July 2009 the company needed an estimated one million servers, consuming an estimated 1.3 Terawatt-hr a year (1.3×10^{12} W-hr). The number of searches has grown over 60% between 2008 and 2009 alone. It is no surprise that the company is planning to manage as many as 10 million servers in the future.

The explosion of video on the net is another disruptive element. The Amesterdam Internet exchange (AMS-IX), which handles approximately 20% of Europe’s traffic, saw its aggregate data traffic increase from 1.75 Petabyte per day in November 2007 to an expected 4 Petabyte per day in November 2009. Much of this rapid increase in traffic is driven by widespread use of voice and, in particular, video over the Internet.

== Current efforts ==
Green Comm Challenge’s founders believe that defining a corollary to Moore’s Law is in order: increases in processor performance must be accompanied by a less-than proportional increase in energy consumption.

This, of course, is no easy undertaking. It will require a new engineering approach to designing computers, cell phones and networks. It will also require a new management culture, capable of recognizing the attractive ROIs that green technology can generate, in addition to being more sensitive to the environmental impact of management's decisions.

This is why Green Comm has fully embraced the ICT energy-efficiency challenge by establishing an interdisciplinary approach that involves some of the most innovative thinkers around the world. We are currently involved in the following four initiatives:

- University of California, Los Angeles: we are coordinating the research efforts of 4 departments: Computer Science, Chemistry, Physics and Mathematics. Biology is expected to follow suit. For the first time in the history of UCLA, these teams have the opportunity to share research facilities and cooperate on Green ICT research projects. We are currently focusing on the study of new materials, superconductors, energy storage and cloud computing architectures. Last but not least, we are looking into the evolution of smart appliances, a project that promises to significantly reduce the energy consumption of user devices by eliminating hard disks and significantly “dumbing down” the processor, making it less energy hungry.
- IESE, in Barcelona, is looking into the management implications of the widespread adoption of Green ICT practices. One of our goals is to educate CEOs on the following key issues:
  - How sensitive is their business to the dynamics of the energy sector
  - What are the implications of energy price disruptions form a customer standpoint? Will customers be more likely to purchase their companies' products because they are more energy efficient, and respectful of the environment?
- Investment Company: research by itself, while essential, will not carry the day. As members of the global business community we must be willing to invest in the future and assume risks. To this end we are planning on closing a $175M investment fund within the end of 2009. The fund will focus on the following areas:
  - Cloud computing
  - New-generation materials
  - Machine to Machine communications, a.k.a. “the Internet of things”, that is the notion that a multiplicity of device types can be allowed to communicate, making the network smarter and more capable of utilizing resources efficiently.
- America's Cup. Green Comm Challenge sees the America’s Cup as more than just a sailing race: it's a unique opportunity to rally some of the best minds in the world behind e very exciting goal: designing and manufacturing the ultimate renewable energy machine, a winning America’s cup boat. While the future of the America’s cup, at least as the multi-country competition the world had come to love, is being decided in a court of law, there is no official timeline for a competition involving the several challengers that have expressed interest in participating. Green Comm Challenge remains committed to the event regardless of what venue and hull type will be chosen eventually.
