= SPECpower =

Type of computer benchmarking tool

SPECpower_ssj2008 is the first industry-standard benchmark that evaluates the power and performance characteristics of volume server class computers. It is available from the Standard Performance Evaluation Corporation (SPEC). SPECpower_ssj2008 is SPEC's first attempt at defining server power measurement standards. It was introduced in December, 2007.

Several SPEC member companies contributed to the development of the new power-performance measurement standard, including AMD, Dell, Fujitsu Siemens Computers, HP, Intel, IBM, and Sun Microsystems.

== See also ==
- Average CPU power
- EEMBC EnergyBench
- IT energy management
- Performance per watt
