= VMmark =

Virtual machine benchmarking tool

- Developer(s): VMware, Inc.
- Stable release: 3.1.0 / February 7, 2019
- Operating system: Microsoft Windows; SUSE Linux
- Platform: x86-compatible
- Type: Benchmark software
- License: Proprietary/Open-source
- Website: VMmark at VMware.com

VMmark is a freeware virtual machine benchmark software suite from VMware, Inc. The suite measures the performance of virtualized servers while running under load on a set of physical hardware. VMmark was independently developed by VMware.

== Technical overview ==
In order to measure the efficiency of the virtualization layer - the hypervisor - the suite must run several virtual machines (VMs) simultaneously. Each VM is configured according to a template, three of which are provided with the VMmark software. The templates mimic typical software applications found in corporate data centers, such as email servers, database servers, and Web servers. The VMmark software collects performance statistics that are relevant to each type of application, such as commits per second for database servers, or page accesses per second for web servers.

VMs are grouped into logical units called "tiles". When evaluating a system's performance, the VMmark software first calculates a score for each tile, culled from the performance statistics produced by each VM, and aggregates the per-tile scores into a final number.

== Software components ==
VMmark uses a mixture of free/open source and proprietary software in its virtual machine templates, such as Apache HTTP Server for Web servers and Microsoft Exchange Server for email servers.

== Industry reception ==
Use and reporting of results have been consistent since introduction, with 20 results posted between June 1, 2013 and June 1, 2014 out of a total of 81 results posted since its introduction at the end of 2012.

As of May 2008, four computer system vendors (Dell Computer, Hewlett-Packard, IBM, and Sun Microsystems) had submitted VMmark benchmark results to VMware.

By October 2009 that had increased to 10 vendors (HP, NEC, IBM, Unisys, Sun, Dell, Inspur, Lenovo, Fujitsu and Cisco)
