= Power usage effectiveness =

Ratio to describe data-center efficiency

Power usage effectiveness (PUE) or power unit efficiency is a ratio that describes how efficiently a computer data center uses energy; specifically, how much energy is used by the computing equipment (in contrast to cooling and other overhead that supports the equipment).

PUE is the ratio of the total amount of energy used by a computer data center facility to the energy delivered to computing equipment. PUE is the inverse of data center infrastructure efficiency.

PUE was originally developed by a consortium called The Green Grid. PUE was published in 2016 as a global standard under ISO/IEC 30134-2:2016

An ideal PUE is 1.0. Anything that isn't considered a computing device in a data center (e.g. lighting, cooling, etc.) falls into the category of facility energy consumption.

$$\mathrm{PUE}  =  {\mbox{Total Facility Energy} \over \mbox{IT Equipment Energy}} = 1 + {\mbox{Non IT Facility Energy} \over \mbox{IT Equipment Energy}}$$

== Issues and problems with the power usage effectiveness ==
The PUE metric is the most popular method of calculating energy efficiency. Although it is the most effective in comparison to other metrics, PUE comes with its share of flaws. This is the most frequently used metric for operators, facility technicians, and building architects to determine how energy efficient their data center buildings are. Some professionals even brag about their PUE being lower than others. Naturally, it is not a surprise that in some cases an operator may “accidentally” not count the energy used for lighting, resulting in lower PUE. This problem is more linked to a human mistake, rather than an issue with the PUE metric system itself.

One real problem is PUE does not account for the climate within the cities the data centers are built. In particular, it does not account for different normal temperatures outside the data center. For example, a data center located in Alaska cannot be effectively compared to a data center in Miami. A colder climate results in a lesser need for a massive cooling system. Cooling systems account for roughly 30 percent of consumed energy in a facility, while the data center equipment accounts for nearly 50 percent. Due to this, the Miami data center may have a final PUE of 1.8 and the data center in Alaska may have a ratio of 1.7, but the Miami data center may be running overall more efficiently. In particular, if it happened to be in Alaska, it may get a better result.

Additionally, according to a case study on Science Direct, "an estimated PUE is practically meaningless unless the IT is working at full capacity".

Solving these simple yet recurring issues, such as the problems associated with the effect of varying temperatures in cities, is necessary to properly calculate all the facility energy consumption. Reducing these problems ensures that further progress and higher standards are always being pushed to improve the success of the PUE for future data center facilities.

To get precise results from an efficiency calculation, all the data associated with the data center must be included. Even a small mistake can cause many differences in PUE results. One practical problem that is frequently noticed in typically data centers include adding the energy endowment of any alternate energy generation systems (such as wind turbines and solar panels) running in parallel with the data center to the PUE, leading to an obfuscation of the true data center performance. Another problem is that some devices that consume power and are associated with a data center may actually share energy or uses elsewhere, causing a huge error on PUE.

== Benefits and limitation ==
PUE was introduced in 2006 and promoted by The Green Grid (a non-profit organization of IT professionals) in 2007, and has become the most commonly used metric for reporting the energy efficiency of data centres. Although it is named "power usage effectiveness", it actually measures the energy use of the data centre.

The PUE metric has several benefits:

1. calculation can be repeated over time, allowing a company to view their efficiency changes historically, or during time-limited events like seasonal changes
2. companies can gauge how more efficient practices (such as powering down idle hardware) affect their overall usage
3. the PUE metric creates competition, “driving efficiencies up as advertised PUE values become lower". Companies can then use PUE as a marketing tool.

However, there are some issues with the PUE metric. The main one arises from the way the ratio is calculated. Because IT load is the sole denominator, any reduction in IT load (for example through virtualisation allowing some hardware to be stood down, or simply through more energy-efficient hardware) will cause the PUE to rise paradoxically.

Some other issues are the efficiency of the power supply network and calculating the accurate IT load. According to the sensitivity analysis by Brady et al., "Total energy consumption is equal to the total amount of energy used by the equipment and infrastructure in the facility (WT) plus the energy losses due to inefficiencies in the power delivery network (WL), hence: PUE=(WT+WL)/WIT." Based on the equation, the inefficiencies of the power delivery network (WL) will increase the total energy consumption of the data center. The PUE value goes up as the data center becomes less efficient. IT load is another important issue of the PUE metric. "It is crucial that an accurate IT load is used for the PUE, and that it is not based upon the rated power use of the equipment. Accuracy in the IT load is one of the major factors affecting the measurement of the PUE metric, as utilization of the servers has an important effect on IT energy consumption and hence the overall PUE value". For example, a data center with high PUE value and high server utilization could be more efficient than a data center with low PUE value and low server utilization. There is also some concern within the industry of PUE as a marketing tool leading some to use the term "PUE Abuse".

Power Compute Effectiveness (PCE) has been proposed in research and industry discussions as a complementary metric to Power Usage Effectiveness. While PUE evaluates the ratio of total facility energy to IT equipment energy, PCE is the ratio of provisioned IT compute power allocation to total provisioned site electrical capacity. Studies and standards‑development groups have examined PCE as part of a broader shift toward compute‑centric efficiency metrics, particularly for environments where workload output provides a more meaningful indicator of system‑level efficiency than infrastructure overhead.

== Notably efficient companies ==
In October 2008, Google's data center was noted to have a ratio of 1.21 PUE across all 6 of its centers, which at the time was considered as close to perfect as possible. Right behind Google was Microsoft, which had another notable PUE ratio of 1.22.

Since 2015, Switch, the developer of SUPERNAP data centers, has had a third party audited colocation PUE of 1.18 for its SUPERNAP 7 Las Vegas, Nevada facility, with an average cold aisle temp of 20.6 °C (69.1 °F) and average humidity of 40.3%. This is attributed to Switch's patented hot aisle containment and HVAC technologies.

As of the end of Q2 2015, Facebook's Prineville data center had a power usage effectiveness (PUE) of 1.078 and its Forest City data center had a PUE of 1.082.

In October 2015, Allied Control has a claimed PUE ratio of 1.02 through the use of two-phase immersion cooling using 3M Novec 7100 fluid.

In January 2016, the Green IT Cube in Darmstadt was dedicated with a 1.07 PUE. It uses cold water cooling through the rack doors.

In February 2017, Supermicro has announced deployment of its disaggregated MicroBlade systems. An unnamed Fortune 100 company has deployed over 30,000 Supermicro MicroBlade servers at its Silicon Valley data center with a (PUE) of 1.06.

Through proprietary innovations in liquid cooling systems, French hosting company OVH has managed to attain a PUE ratio of 1.09 in its data centers in Europe and North America while in 2023 they reported a 12 months overall PUE of 1.29.

In 2021, Google reported a PUE of 1.1 across their data centers worldwide, and less than 1.06 for their best sites.

In scientific projects in 2022, the Research Institutes of Sweden reported a PUE of 1.0148, notably reached in the north of Sweden.

== Standards ==
PUE was published in 2016 as a global standard under ISO/IEC 30134-2:2016 as well as a European standard under EN 50600-4-2:2016.

== See also ==
- Data center infrastructure efficiency
- Performance per watt
- Green power usage effectiveness
- Green computing
- IT energy management
- Water usage effectiveness (WUE)
