= IT energy management =

Analysis and management of energy demand

IT energy management or Green IT is the analysis and management of energy demand within the Information Technology (IT) department in any organization.

== History ==
In the 2000s, IT energy demand accounted for approximately 2% of global CO_{2} emissions, approximately the same level as aviation, and represents over 10% of all the global energy consumption (over 50% of aviation's energy consumption). IT can account for 25% of a modern office building's energy cost.

At one point, the main sources of manageable IT energy demand were personal computers (PC)s and Monitors, accounting for 39% of energy use, followed by data centers and servers, accounting for 23% of energy use. In 2006, US IT infrastructures consumed an estimated 61 billion kWh of energy, totaling to a cost of $4.5 billion. This constitutes about 1.5% of total US electricity consumption Significant opportunities exist for enterprises to optimise their IT energy usage.

In 2018, computers, data centers and networks accounted for 10% of the world's electricity consumption, with 30% ascribed to power terminal equipment (computers, mobiles and other devices), 30% consumed by data centers and 40% fuels online network. A router may consume 10 KW, and a large data center may consume up to 100 MW.

A 2025 report by the International Energy Agency (IEA) projects that data centres will increase, from a 2024 global electricity consumption of 460 TWh, to over 1000 TWh by 2030, then 1300 TWh by 2035, with artificial intelligence (AI) as the main driver of increased demand.

== Server and data center power management ==
Fueled by growth in artificial intelligence, data centers' demand for power increased in the 2020s.

Servers and data centers account for 23% of IT energy demand. As hardware becomes smaller and less expensive, energy costs constitute a larger portion of server or data center costs. Data centers can consume up to 100 times more energy than a standard office building. A 2025 white paper by the Electric Power Research Institute (EPRI) projects that data centers will consume up to 12% of the American power grid by 2030.

Often, less than 15% of original source energy is used for the information technology equipment within a data center. With the introduction of new technologies and products, energy management of several IT equipments has been greatly improved. These allow gains to be made through optimisation of servers. This is typically done through diagnostic testing of individual servers, then development of a model for a data center's energy demand using these measurements. By analysing every server in a data centre, server power management software can identify servers that can be removed. It also enables servers to be virtualized, processes to be consolidated to a smaller number of servers, and servers with a predictable cyclical power demand to be fully powered down when not in use. Active power management features are also included which put remaining servers into their lowest power state that allows instant wake-up on demand when required.

Energy efficiency benchmarks, such as SPECpower, or specifications, like Average CPU power, can be used for comparing server efficiency and performance per watt.

== PC power management ==
A research study shows that in the US, 50% of PCs are left on overnight, resulting in an estimated annual energy waste of 28.8 billion kWh, and a cost of $2.8 billion per year. User behavior is slightly different in Europe, with approximately 28% of PCs being left on overnight in the UK, resulting in an estimated energy loss of 2.5 billion kWh, costing £300 million per year. In Germany, with approximately 30% of PCs left on overnight, it is estimated 4.8 billion kWh of energy are wasted each year, costing €919 million There is a significant market in third-party power management software offering features beyond those present in the Windows operating system.

== Energy-Efficient Ethernet ==
Energy-Efficient Ethernet (IEEE 802.3az) could reduce the energy use of networking equipment. In 2005, all the network-interface controllers in the United States (in computers, switches, and routers) used an estimated 5.3 terawatt-hours of electricity. According to a researcher at the Lawrence Berkeley Laboratory, Energy-Efficient Ethernet could save an estimated $450 million a year in energy costs in the U.S. With most of the savings from home computers ($200 million), and offices ($170 million), and the remaining $80 million from data centers. Energy-efficient Ethernet saves energy by allowing network links to either go into a low power sleep mode or run at a slower rate when there is no data. It also defines lower power signaling for use on higher quality cables.

== Organisations and resources for IT energy management ==
There are a number of industry associations and policy organisations whose work on promoting energy-efficiency includes providing resources and information on IT energy management. These include:

- The Green Grid
- Alliance to Save Energy
- Climate Savers Computing Initiative
- 2Degrees (Low Carbon ITC Network)
- Electric Power Research Institute (EPRI)

== See also ==
- Data center infrastructure efficiency
- Energy-Efficient Ethernet
- Performance per watt
- Power usage effectiveness
