= Data center infrastructure efficiency =

Data center infrastructure efficiency (DCIE), is a performance improvement metric used to calculate the energy efficiency of a data center. DCIE is the percentage value derived, by dividing information technology equipment power by total facility power.

== See also ==
- Power usage effectiveness
- Performance per watt
- Green computing
- Data center infrastructure management
- IT energy management
- Electric Power Research Institute (EPRI)
