= Performance per watt =

Computer energy efficiency

In computing, performance per watt is a measure of the energy efficiency of a particular computer architecture or computer hardware. Literally, it measures the rate of computation that can be delivered by a computer for every watt of power consumed. This rate is typically measured by performance on the LINPACK benchmark when trying to compare between computing systems: an example using this is the Green500 list of supercomputers. Performance per watt has been suggested to be a measure of sustainable computing.

System designers building parallel computers often pick CPUs based on their performance per watt, because the cost of powering the CPU outweighs the cost of the CPU itself.

Spaceflight computers have hard limits on the maximum power available and also have hard requirements on minimum real-time performance. A ratio of processing speed to required electrical power is more useful than raw processing speed.

== Definition ==
The performance and power-consumption metrics used depend on the definition; reasonable measures of performance are FLOPS, MIPS, or the score for any performance benchmark. Several measures of power usage may be employed, depending on the purposes of the metric; for example, a metric might only consider the electrical power delivered to a machine directly, while another might include all power necessary to run a computer, such as cooling and monitoring systems. The power measurement is often the average power used while running the benchmark, but other measures of power usage may be employed (e.g. peak power, idle power).

For example, the early UNIVAC I computer performed approximately 0.015 operations per watt-second (performing 1,905 operations per second (OPS), while consuming 125 kW). The Fujitsu FR-V VLIW/vector processor system on a chip in the 4 FR550 core variant released 2005 performs 51 Giga-OPS with 3 watts of power consumption, resulting in 17 billion operations per watt-second. This is an improvement by over a trillion times in 54 years.

Most of the power a computer uses is converted into heat, so a system that takes fewer watts to do a job will require less cooling to maintain a given operating temperature. Reduced cooling demands makes it easier to quiet a computer. Lower energy consumption can also make it less costly to run, and reduce the environmental impact of powering the computer (see green computing). If installed where there is limited climate control, a lower-power computer will operate at a lower temperature, which may make it more reliable. In a climate-controlled environment, reductions in direct power use may also create savings in climate-control energy.

Computing energy consumption is sometimes also measured by reporting the energy required to run a particular benchmark, for instance EEMBC EnergyBench. Energy consumption figures for a standard workload may make it easier to judge the effect of an improvement in energy efficiency.

When performance is defined as operations/second, then performance per watt can be written as operations/(watt-second). Since a watt is one joule/second, then performance per watt can also be written as operations/joule.

== FLOPS per watt ==
Exponential growth of supercomputer performance per watt based on data from the Green500 list. The red crosses denote the most power efficient computer, while the blue ones denote the computer ranked#500.

FLOPS per watt is a common measure. Like the FLOPS (floating point operations per second) metric it is based on, the metric is usually applied to scientific computing and simulations involving many floating-point calculations.

=== Examples ===
As of June 2016, the Green500 list rates the two most efficient supercomputers highest – those are both based on the same manycore accelerator PEZY-SCnp Japanese technology in addition to Intel Xeon processors – both at RIKEN, the top one at 6673.8 MFLOPS/watt; and the third ranked is the Chinese-technology Sunway TaihuLight (a much bigger machine, that is the ranked 2nd on TOP500, the others are not on that list) at 6051.3 MFLOPS/watt.

In June 2012, the Green500 list rated BlueGene/Q, Power BQC 16C as the most efficient supercomputer on the TOP500 in terms of FLOPS per watt, running at 2,100.88 MFLOPS/watt.

In November 2010, IBM machine, Blue Gene/Q achieves 1,684 MFLOPS/watt.

On 9 June 2008, CNN reported that IBM's Roadrunner supercomputer achieved 376 MFLOPS/watt.

As part of the Intel Tera-Scale research project, the team produced an 80-core CPU that can achieve over 16,000 MFLOPS/watt. The future of that CPU is not certain.

Microwulf, a low-cost desktop Beowulf cluster of four dual-core Athlon 64 X2 3800+ computers, runs at 58 MFLOPS/watt.

Kalray has developed a 256-core VLIW CPU that achieves 25,000 MFLOPS/watt. The next generation is expected to achieve 75,000 MFLOPS/watt. However, in 2019 their latest chip for embedded is 80-core and claims up to 4 TFLOPS at 20 W.

Adapteva announced the Epiphany V, a 1024-core 64-bit RISC processor intended to achieve 75 GFLOPS/watt, though they later announced that the Epiphany V was "unlikely" to become available as a commercial product.

== GPU efficiency ==
Graphics processing units (GPU) have continued to increase in energy usage, while CPUs designers have recently focused on improving performance per watt. High-performance GPUs may draw large amount of power, so intelligent techniques are required to manage GPU power consumption. Measures like 3DMark2006 score per watt can help identify more efficient GPUs. However, that may not adequately incorporate efficiency in typical use, where much time is spent doing less-demanding tasks.

With modern GPUs, energy usage is an important constraint on the maximum computational capabilities that can be achieved. GPU designs are usually highly scalable, allowing the manufacturer to put multiple chips on the same video card, or to use multiple video cards that work in parallel. Peak performance of any system is essentially limited by the amount of power it can draw and the amount of heat it can dissipate. Consequently, performance per watt of a GPU design translates directly into peak performance of a system that uses that design.

Since GPUs may also be used for some general-purpose computation, sometimes their performance is measured in terms also applied to CPUs, such as FLOPS per watt.

== Challenges ==
While performance per watt is useful, absolute power requirements are also important. Claims of improved performance per watt may be used to mask increasing power demands. For instance, though newer-generation GPU architectures may provide better performance per watt, continued performance increases can negate the gains in efficiency, and the GPUs continue to consume large amounts of power.

Benchmarks that measure power under heavy load may not adequately reflect typical efficiency. For instance, 3DMark stresses the 3D performance of a GPU, but many computers spend most of their time doing less-intense display tasks (idle, 2D tasks, displaying video). So the 2D or idle efficiency of the graphics system may be at least as significant for overall energy efficiency. Likewise, systems that spend much of their time in standby or soft off are not adequately characterized by just efficiency under load. To help address this some benchmarks, like SPECpower, include measurements at a series of load levels.

The efficiency of some electrical components, such as voltage regulators, decreases with increasing temperature, so the power used may increase with temperature. Power supplies, motherboards, and some video cards are some of the subsystems affected by this. Their power draw may depend on temperature, and the temperature or temperature dependence should be noted when measuring.

Performance per watt also typically does not include full life-cycle costs. Since computer manufacturing is energy intensive, and computers often have a relatively short lifespan, energy and materials involved in production, distribution, disposal, and recycling often make up significant portions of their cost, energy use, and environmental impact.

Energy required for climate control of the computer's surroundings is often not counted in the wattage calculation, but it can be significant.

== Other energy efficiency measures ==
SWaP (space, wattage and performance) is a Sun Microsystems metric for data centers, incorporating power and space:

$$\mathrm{SWaP} = \frac{\mathrm{Performance}}{\mathrm{Space} \cdot \mathrm{Power}},$$

where performance is measured by any appropriate benchmark, and space is size of the computer.

Reduction of power, mass, and volume is also important for spaceflight computers.

== See also ==
Energy efficiency benchmarks

- Average CPU power (ACP) – a measure of power consumption when running several standard benchmarks
- EEMBC – EnergyBench
- SPECpower – a benchmark for web servers running Java (server-side Java operations per joule)

Other

- Data center infrastructure efficiency (DCIE)
- Energy proportional computing
- IT energy management
- Koomey's law
- Landauer's principle
- Low-power electronics
- Power usage effectiveness (PUE)
- Processor power dissipation
