= The Green Grid =

Consortium improve the resource efficiency of data centers

- Formation: February 26, 2007
- Type: Non-profit
- Headquarters: Washington, DC
- Location: International
- Members: 35+
- Website: Official website

The Green Grid is a nonprofit, industry consortium of end-users, policy-makers, technology providers, facility architects, and utility companies collaborating to improve the resource efficiency of data centers.

As business demands increase, so does the number of data center facilities which house a rising amount of IT equipment. Data center managers run into resource limits on electrical power, cooling, and space.

== History ==
An initial announcement in April 2006 included members Advanced Micro Devices, Dell, Hewlett-Packard, IBM, and Sun Microsystems. They were soon joined by Intel and Microsoft. By February 26, 2007, APC by Schneider Electric, Rackable Systems, SprayCool (later part of Parker Hannifin), and VMware had joined the effort, and a meeting in April 2007 was announced.
In March, 2011, the Green Grid proposed a new sustainability metric, Water Usage Effectiveness (WUE), which attempts to take into account the amount of water used by data centers in their cooling systems

In April 2019, The Green Grid became an affiliate member of the Information Technology Industry Council.

== Participants ==
In 2015, the Board of Directors had the following members:

- Cisco Systems
- Dell
- Digital Realty
- EMC
- Emerson Network Power
- Hewlett-Packard
- IBM
- Intel
- Schneider Electric
- Siemens

In 2007, the Board of Directors had the following members:

- AMD
- APC
- Dell
- EMC
- Emerson Network Power
- HP
- IBM
- Intel
- Microsoft
- Oracle
- Symantec

== See also ==
- Green computing
