= Beth (given name) =

Beth is a feminine given name. It is often short for Elizabeth, Elsbeth (Scottish version of Elizabeth), Bethany or Bethan.

== People ==
- Beth (singer) (born 1981), Spanish singer
- Beth Aala, American filmmaker
- Beth Accomando, American film critic
- Beth Akers (born 1983), American economist
- Beth Alexander (born 2003), English field hockey player
- Beth Allen (golfer) (born 1981), American professional golfer
- Beth Allen (born 1984), New Zealand actress
- Beth Altringer, American product designer
- Beth Amos (1916–1996), Canadian actress
- Beth Amsel, American folk singer
- Beth Anders (born 1951), American field hockey player and coach
- Beth Anderson (composer) (born 1950), American composer
- Beth Anderson (born 1954), American singer
- Beth M. Andrus (born 1963), American judge
- Beth Diane Armstrong, South African sculptor
- Beth Arnoult (born 1965), American wheelchair tennis player
- Beth Ashley (1926–2020), American author and columnist
- Beth Axelrod, American-born Human Resources leader
- Beth Bachmann, American poet
- Beth Bader (born 1973), American professional golfer
- Beth Bailey, American historian
- Beth Baker (born 1961), American judge
- Beth Allison Barr, American historian
- Beth Barr (born 1971), American swimmer
- Beth Bauer (born 1980), American professional golfer
- Beth Ann Bauman (born 1964), American writer
- Beth Beglin (born 1957), American field hockey player
- Beth Behrs (born 1985), American actress
- Beth S. Benedict, American professor
- Beth Bentley (1921–2021), American poet
- Beth Bernobich, American writer
- Beth Bernstein, American politician
- Beth Beskin (born 1959), American politician
- Beth Blacklock (born 1997), Scottish international rugby union player
- Beth Bloom (born 1962), American judge
- Beth Bombara (born 1983), American singer-songwriter
- Beth Bonner (1952–1998), American long-distance runner
- BethAnn Bonner (born 1982), American actress
- Beth Botsford (born 1981), American swimmer
- Beth Brant (1941–2015), Mohawk poet
- Beth Brinkmann (born 1958), American lawyer
- Beth Broderick (born 1959), American actress
- Beth Bronger-Jones, American curler
- Beth Brooke-Marciniak, American businesswoman
- Beth Brown, multiple people
- Beth Buchanan (born 1952), Australian actress
- Beth Burns (born 1957), American basketball coach
- Beth Buttimer (born 2005), Irish rugby union player
- Beth Bye, American politician
- Beth Cahill (born 1963), American television actress
- Beth Camp (born 1974), American politician
- Beth Campbell, several people
- Beth Carey (born 1990), Australian volleyball player
- Beth Carvalho (1946–2019), Brazilian singer and composer
- Beth Catlin (born 1958), American autistic savant
- Beth Cato (born 1980), American author
- Beth Cavener Stichter (born 1972), American artist
- Beth Chamberlin (born 1963), American actress
- Beth Chance, American statistics educator
- Beth Chapman, several people
- Beth Chatto (1923–2018), British garden designer
- Beth Chote (born 1991), New Zealand actress
- Beth Clark (born 1972), New Zealand footballer
- Beth Clayton, American opera singer
- Beth Coats (born 1966), American biathlete
- Beth Cobden (born 1993), English netball international
- Beth Cobert, American businesswoman
- Beth Cochran (born 1964), Canadian-American educator and educational consultant
- Beth Cohen, multiple people
- Beth Coleman, American composer
- Beth Combs (born 1969), American basketball coach
- Beth Comstock (born 1960), American business executive
- Beth Cordingly (born 1977), English actress
- Beth Coulter (born 2005), Irish golfer
- Beth Couture (born 1962), American women's basketball coach
- Beth Croft (born 1986), English Christian musician
- Beth Cullen-Kerridge, English sculptor
- Beth Cunningham, multiple people
- Beth Cuthand, First Nations writer
- Beth Daniel (born 1956), American golfer
- Beth Darnall, American scientist and pain psychologist
- Beth Dawson, American biostatistician
- Beth de Araújo, American director
- Beth Deare, American film producer
- Beth Denisch (born 1958), American composer
- Beth Ditto (born 1981), American singer-songwriter
- Beth Dobbin (born 1994), British sprinter
- Beth Doglio, American politician
- Beth Dover (born 1978), American actress
- Beth Dunkenberger (born 1966), American women's basketball coach
- Beth Edmonds (born 1950), American politician
- Beth Ehlers (born 1968), American politician
- Beth Elliott (born 1950), American transgender activist, singer and author
- Beth Ellis (c. 1874–1913), British novelist and travel writer
- Beth Fantaskey, American author
- Beth Ann Fennelly (born 1971), American poet and writer
- Beth Fertig, American journalist
- Beth Finch (1921–2012), American politician and businesswoman
- Beth Folsom (born 1957), American politician
- Beth Ford (born 1964), American businessperson
- Beth Fowler (born 1940), American actress and singer
- Beth Franklyn (1870–1956), American actress
- Beth Fuller, American politician
- Beth Labson Freeman (born 1953), American judge
- Beth Fukumoto (born 1983), American politician
- Beth Gaines (born 1959), American politician
- Beth Gallagher, American actress
- Beth Gardner Helfrich (born 1981), American politician
- Beth Garrabrant, American artistic photographer
- Beth Gibbons (born 1965), English singer-songwriter
- Beth Gladen, American biostatistician
- Beth Glaros (born 1992), American women's lacrosse player
- Beth Gleeson (1943–1989), Australian politician
- Beth Goddard (born 1969), British actress
- Beth Goetz (born 1974), American soccer player and athletics administrator
- Beth Goobie (born 1959), Canadian poet and writer
- Beth Gott (1922–2022), Australian botanist
- Beth Goulart (born 1961), Brazilian actress, singer and playwright
- Beth Grant (born 1949), American actress
- Beth Ann Griffin, American statistician
- Beth Griffin (born 1967), American politician
- Beth Groundwater, American novelist
- Beth Gutcheon (born 1945), American author
- Beth Gylys (born 1964), American poet and professor of English and Creative Writing
- Beth Hagendorf (born 1981), American actress
- Beth Hall (born 1958), American actress
- Beth Haller, American communications leader
- Beth Hamilton (born 1980), Canadian curler
- Beth M. Hammack, American economist, academic and public servant
- Beth Harbison (born 1966), American author
- Beth Harrington (born 1955), American filmmaker and musician
- Beth Hart (born 1972), American singer
- Beth Harwell (born 1957), American politician
- Beth Hayes (1955–1984), American economist
- Beth Hazel (born 1974), Canadian swimmer
- Beth Healey, British medical doctor
- Beth Heiden (born 1959), American athlete
- Beth Henley (born 1952), American actress
- Beth Herr (born 1964), American tennis player
- Beth Hesmondhalgh, British suffragette and hunger striker
- Beth Hirsch (born 1967), American singer-songwriter
- Beth Holloway (born 1961), American speech pathologist
- Beth Howland (1939–2015), American actress
- Beth Hutchens, jewelry designer
- Beth Iskiw (born 1979), Canadian curler
- Beth Janson, Canadian film industry executive
- Beth Jeans Houghton (born 1990), English singer-songwriter
- Beth Johnson, multiple people
- Beth Jones, Welsh comedian
- Beth Junor, British speech therapist and anti-nuclear activist
- Beth Jurgeleit (born 1980), New Zealand field hockey player
- Beth Kaplan (born 1950), Canadian writer, teacher and actor
- Beth Kaplin, Rwandan conservation scientist, professor, and researcher
- Beth Karas (born 1957), American television reporter
- Beth Karlan, American gynecologic oncologist
- Beth Katleman (born 1959), sculptor
- Beth Keller (born 1978), American soccer player
- Beth Kelly, American political theorist
- Beth Kempton (born 1977), British Japanologist, cultural coordinator and interpreter
- Beth Kennett (born 1964), American politician
- Beth Kephart, American author
- Beth Kerttula (born 1956), American politician
- Beth Keser, American electronics engineer
- Beth Killoran, American information technology executive and civil servant
- Beth Kingston (born 1986), English actress
- Beth Kobliner (born 1965), American journalist
- Beth Koigi, Kenyan entrepreneur
- Beth Krom (born 1958), American politician
- Beth Krommes (born 1956), American illustrator
- Beth Krush (1918–2009), American illustrator
- Beth Langston (born 1992), English cricketer
- Beth Lapides, American entertainer
- Beth Lear, American politician
- Beth Leavel (born 1955), American stage actress
- Beth Levin, multiple people
- Beth Levine, multiple people
- Beth Levison, American documentary film producer and director
- Beth Liebling (born 1967), American musician
- Beth Lindsay, Scottish curler
- Beth Lipman, American glass artist
- Beth Lisick (born 1968), American writer
- Beth Liston (born 1974), American politician
- Beth Littleford (born 1968), American actress
- Beth Lo (born 1949), American artist, ceramist and educator
- Beth Long (1948–2024), American politician
- Beth Lord (born 1976), Canadian philosopher
- Beth Lydy (c. 1896–1979), American actress, operetta singer, writer, educator, and theatrical producer
- Beth Lygoe (born 1981), Saint Lucian sailor
- Beth Lynch (born 1997), Australian rules footballer
- Beth MacGregor (born 1993), English cricketer
- Beth MacKenzie (1960–2013), Canadian politician and registered nurse
- Beth Macy, American journalist and writer
- Beth Madsen (born 1964), American alpine skier
- Beth Maitland (born 1958), American actress
- Beth Mallard (born 1981), New Zealand rugby player
- Beth Malone (born 1969), American actress and singer
- Beth Marion (1912–2003), American actress
- Beth Martinez Humenik, American politician
- Beth Mason (born 1960), American politician
- Beth May, American podcast host
- Beth McCann (born 1949), American lawyer and politician
- Beth McCarthy-Miller (born 1963), American television director
- Beth McCluskey (born 1971), Irish mountain bike racer
- Beth McColl (born 1993), English non-fiction writer
- Beth McKay (born 1996), Scottish footballer
- Beth McKee, American singer-songwriter
- Beth McKillop, British Sinologist and Koreanist
- Beth McLachlin (born 1950), American volleyball player and coach
- Beth McNeill (born 1982), New Zealand politician
- Beth Meacham (born 1951), American writer and editor
- Beth Mead (born 1995), English association footballer
- Beth Meyers (born 1959), American politician
- Beth Meyerson, American professor
- Beth Milstein (born 1957), American screenwriter and producer
- Beth Mitchell (1972–1998), American shag dancer and schoolteacher
- Beth Mizell (born 1952), American politician
- Beth E. Mooney, American banking executive
- Beth Mooney (born 1994), Australian cricketer
- Beth Moore (born 1957), American evangelical leader
- Beth Moore (politician) (born 1982), American politician
- Beth Morris (1943–2018), British stage and screen actress
- Beth Morrison, American producer
- Beth Moses (born 1969), American commercial astronaut
- Beth Mowins (born 1967), American sports journalist and announcer
- Beth Wambui Mugo (born 1939), Kenyan politician
- Beth Munro (born 1993), British taekwondo practitioner
- Beth Murphy, American film director
- Beth Nealson (c. 1910–1994), Canadian politician
- Beth Nguyen (born 1974), American novelist and nonfiction writer
- Beth Nielsen Chapman (born 1958), American singer and songwriter
- Beth Nolan (born 1951), American lawyer
- Beth Nordholt, American physicist
- Beth Norton (born 1957), American tennis player
- Beth Nugent, American writer and academic
- Beth O'Connor, American politician and activist
- Beth O'Leary (born 1992), British writer
- Beth Orcutt, American oceanographer
- Beth Orton (born 1970), English singer-songwriter
- Beth Ostrosky Stern (born 1972), American actress and model
- Beth Overmoyer, American physician and oncologist
- Beth Palmer (1952–2019), American bridge player
- Beth Parker, multiple people
- Beth Parks (born 1966), American physicist
- Beth Pascall (born 1987), British ultrarunner
- Beth Pasternak, Canadian costume designer
- Beth Patterson, American musician
- Beth Paxson (born 1960), American skier
- Beth Pearce, American politician
- Beth Peters (1931–2024), American actress
- Beth Peterson (born 1994), Canadian curler
- Beth Phillips (born 1969), American judge
- Beth Phinney (born 1938), Canadian politician
- Beth Phoenix (born 1980), Polish American professional wrestler and former WWE Diva
- Beth Piatote, Native American scholar and author
- Beth Plale, computer scientist
- Beth Porch (born 1994), English pop singer
- Beth Porter (1942–2023), American actress
- Beth Potter (born 1991), Scottish long-distance runner and triathlete
- Beth Powning, Canadian author
- Beth Pruitt, American engineer
- Beth Raymer, American writer
- Beth Reekles (born 1995), Welsh author
- Beth Reinhard, American investigative journalist
- Beth Revis (born 1981), American novelist
- Beth Richards, American politician
- Beth Riesgraf (born 1978), American actress
- Beth Rigby (born 1976), British journalist
- Beth Riggle, American Paralympic swimmer
- Beth Riva (born 2003), Scottish lawn and indoor bowler
- Beth Robert (born 1977), Welsh television actress
- Beth Robertson Fiddes, Scottish artist
- Beth Robinson (born 1965), American judge
- Beth Rodd, American politician
- Beth Rodden (born 1980), American rock climber
- Beth Rodford (born 1982), British rower
- Beth Rogan (1931–2015), British film actress
- Beth Rogers, marketing academic
- Beth Ross (born 1996), New Zealand rower
- Beth Rowley (born 1981), British singer-songwriter
- Beth Rubino (born 1980), American professional wrestler
- Beth Rudin DeWoody (born 1952), American art patron
- Beth Sanner, American government official
- Beth Saulnier, American writer and editor
- Beth Sawyer, member of the New Jersey General Assembly
- Beth Schultz, Australian environmentalist
- Beth Schwartz, American television writer
- Beth Shak (born 1969), American poker player
- Beth Shapiro (born 1976), American evolutionary molecular biologist
- Beth Sherburn (born 1991), English singer-songwriter
- Beth Shimmin (born 1987), Australian netball player
- Beth Shriever (born 1999), British BMX rider
- Beth A. Simmons, American political scientist
- Beth Singler (born 1980), British anthropologist
- Beth Slingerland (1900–1989), American educator
- Beth Soll, American dancer
- Beth Solomon (born 1952), American professional golfer
- Beth Sorrentino, American singer-songwriter
- Beth Sotelo (born 1974), American comic book colorist
- Beth Stelling, American comedian and comedy writer
- Beth Stetson, American economist
- Beth Stevens, neuroscientist
- Beth Storry (born 1978), English field hockey goalkeeper
- Beth Sullivan, American television producer
- Beth Sulzer-Azaroff (1929–2022), American psychologist
- Beth Sutton, American surgeon
- Beth Tabor (born 1964), Canadian cyclist
- Beth Taylor (born 1993), Scottish operatic mezzo-soprano
- Beth Thornley, American singer-songwriter
- Beth Todd, American biochemical engineer
- Beth Torina (born 1978), American softball coach
- Beth Toussaint (born 1962), American actress
- Beth Troutman (born 1977), American television personality
- Beth Turner (born 1958), American politician
- Beth Tweddle (born 1985), English artistic gymnast
- Beth Underhill (born 1962), Canadian equestrian
- Beth Van Duyne (born 1970), American politician
- Beth Van Fleet (born 1977), American beach volleyball player
- Beth Van Hoesen (1926–2010), American visual artist
- Beth Van Schaack, American academic and former diplomat
- Beth Walker, multiple people
- Beth Webb, British children's author
- Beth Slater Whitson (1879–1930), American songwriter
- Beth Whittall (1936–2015), Canadian swimmer
- Beth Wilcock (born 2001), English rugby union player
- Beth Wilkinson (born 1962), American lawyer
- Beth Williams, several people
- Beth Willis (born 1978), British television producer
- Beth Willman, American astronomer
- Beth Wilson, Australian public servant
- Beth Winkelstein, American bioengineer and scholar
- Beth Winter (born 1974), British politician
- Beth Wiseman, multiple people
- Beth Wood (born 1954), U.S. state auditor
- Beth Wymer, American gymnast
- Beth Zanders (née Baker, 1913–2009), New Zealand artist

== Characters ==
- Beth, a character in the Canadian-produced sitcom Learning the Ropes
- Beth, a character in the Canadian teen drama television series Madison
- Beth, a character in the 2005 American romantic comedy movie The 40-Year-Old Virgin
- Beth, a character in the 2005 romantic comedy-drama movie Imagine Me & You
- Beth, a character in the 2025 American action comedy The Naked Gun
- Beth, a character played by Jennifer Aniston in the 2009 American romantic comedy-drama movie He's Just Not That Into You
- Beth, in the animated series Total Drama
- Beth, a character in the Adventure Time episode "Come Along with Me"
- Beth Bailey, in TV series Spooks
- Beth Baker, a character played by Nicole Eggert in the 2006 superhero movie Lightspeed
- Beth Brennan, in TV series Neighbours
- Elizabeth (Beth) Buchwald, a character in the 2009 American romantic comedy-drama movie Adam
- Elizabeth "Beth" Childs, in the TV series Orphan Black
- Beth Clement, in TV series Hollyoaks
- Beth Dutton, a character in Yellowstone
- Beth Fox, a character in the American sitcom television series Coach
- Beth Green, in TV series The Bill
- Beth Greene, in TV series The Walking Dead
- Beth Gordon, a character from the Ghost Whisperer
- Beth Hunter, in TV series Home and Away
- Beth Jordache, in TV series Brookside
- Elizabeth "Beth" March, in Louisa May Alcott's novel Little Women
- Beverly Elizabeth "Beth" Nicholls in the TV series No Angels
- Elizabeth "Beth" Harmon in the novel and TV miniseries The Queen's Gambit
- Beth Stanley, a character in the 1998 American science-fiction disaster movie Deep Impact
- Beth Ryan, a character in the 1987 movie Throw Momma from the Train
- Beth Smith (née Sanchez), in the Adult Swim cartoon Rick and Morty
- Beth Tezuka, a character in Bravest Warriors
- Beth Trevino, a character in the 1993 American action film Falling Down
- Beth Williams, character in the TV soap EastEnders

== See also ==
- Bet (disambiguation)
- Beth (disambiguation)
- Bethany (disambiguation)
- Elizabeth (disambiguation)
