= Russell W. Cooper =

American macroeconomist

Russell Wade Cooper (born 1955) is an American macroeconomist who is currently a professor at Liaoning University in Liaoning, China. He has previously held academic positions at the European University Institute, University of Texas, Yale University, the University of Iowa, Pennsylvania State University and Boston University. Cooper received his bachelor's degree in Economics and International Relations at Clark University, and received his Master of Arts and Ph.D. in economics from the University of Pennsylvania. He has published over 60 publications ranging from labor economics to game theory, and four books as of 2017. He is best known for his work on coordination games. He is the author of the book Coordination Games, and the co-author of Dynamic Economics with Jerome Adda. An early work on multi-period insurance contracts with Beth Hayes is still regularly cited.

== Selected publications ==
- Cooper, R., Liu, H., Mismatch in human capital accumulation, International economic review, 2019, Vol. 60, No. 3, pp. 1291–1328
- Camous, A., Cooper, R., 'Whatever it takes' is all you need : monetary policy and debt fragility, American economic journal-macroeconomics, 2019, Vol. 11, No. 4, pp. 38–81
- Cooper, R., Kempf, H., Peled, D., Insulation impossible : monetary policy and regional debt spillovers in a federation, Journal of the European economic association, 2014, Vol. 12, No. 2, pp. 465–491
- Bonaparte, Y., Cooper, R., Zhu, G., Consumption smoothing and portfolio rebalancing : the effects of adjustment costs, Journal of Monetary Economics, 2012, Vol. 59, No. 8, pp. 751–768
