= Elizabeth Williams =

Elizabeth, Elisabeth, Liz, Lizzie or Betty Williams may refer to:

== Arts and entertainment ==
- Elizabeth Williams Champney (née Elizabeth Williams, 1850–1922), American author
- Elizabeth Williams (actress) (fl. 1920–1930), American actress
- Dail Ambler (Betty Mabel Lilian Williams, 1919–1974), English pulp fiction author and screenwriter who also wrote as Danny Spade
- Elizabeth Williams (producer) (born 1949/1950), American theater producer
- Elisabeth Omilami (née Elisabeth Williams, born 1951), American actress
- Elizabeth Williams (artist) (fl. 1980s–2010s), American courtroom artist
- Liz Williams (born 1965), British science fiction author
- Emma Kennedy (Elizabeth Emma Williams, born 1967), British TV presenter
- Elisabeth Williams (fl. 2010s), American art director, production designer and set decorator

== Medicine and science ==
- Elizabeth Langdon Williams (1879–1981), American astronomer and computer
- Elizabeth Williams (educationist) (1895–1986), British mathematician
- Betty Smith Williams (fl. 1950s–1990s), American nurse

== Military ==
- Betty Jane Williams (1919–2008), American aviator
- Elizabeth Williams (photographer) (born 1924), American military photographer

== Politics ==
- Betty Williams (1943–2020), Nobel Peace Prize recipient from Northern Ireland
- Betty Williams (politician) (born 1944), Welsh Labour Party politician and MP
- Buffy Williams (Elizabeth Williams, born 1976), Welsh Labour Party politician and MS

== Sport ==
- Lizzie Williams (born 1983), Australian cyclist
- Elizabeth Williams (basketball) (born 1993), American basketball player

== Other people ==
- Elizabeth Whitney Williams (1844–1938), American lighthouse keeper and writer
- Elizabeth Williams Champney (1850–1922), American writer
- Elizabeth Sprague Williams (1869–1922), American social worker
- Betty Williams (died 1961), victim in the Kiss and Kill homicide
- Betty Smith Williams, American nurse

== Fictional characters ==
- Betty Williams (Coronation Street), a character on Coronation Street

== See also ==
- Beth Williams (disambiguation)
