= Beth Parker =

Beth Parker may refer to:

- Beth L. Parker, Canadian scientist
- Elizabeth Tracy Mae "Bethe" Wettlaufer (née Parker) (born 1967), Canadian serial killer
