= Bethan =

- Pronunciation: /ˈbɛθən/ BETH-ən
- Gender: Female

Origin
- Meaning: Disputed, possibly a diminutive of "Elizabeth".
- Region of origin: Wales

Other names
- Nicknames: Beth, Bet, Betty
- Related names: Elizabeth, Beth, Bethany, Betty

Bethan (Welsh pronunciation: [ˈbɛθan]) is a Welsh feminine given name, and may refer to the following people:

- Bethan Elfyn (21st century), Welsh radio and television presenter
- Bethan Gwanas (born 1962), Welsh author
- Bethan Huws (born 1961), Welsh artist
- Bethan Jenkins (born 1981), Welsh politician
- Bethan Leadley, also known as Leadley (born 1995), English singer-songwriter, YouTuber, and presenter
- Beth Winter (born 1974), Welsh politician
- Bethan Wright (born 1996), English actress and model

== See also ==
- Bethany (given name)
- Beth (given name)
- Bethan, Nepal
- Bethan's Rock – a small grey-and-white stone donated to Poole Museum in 2019 by a five-year-old girl named Bethan
