= Beth Darnall =

American scientist and pain psychologist

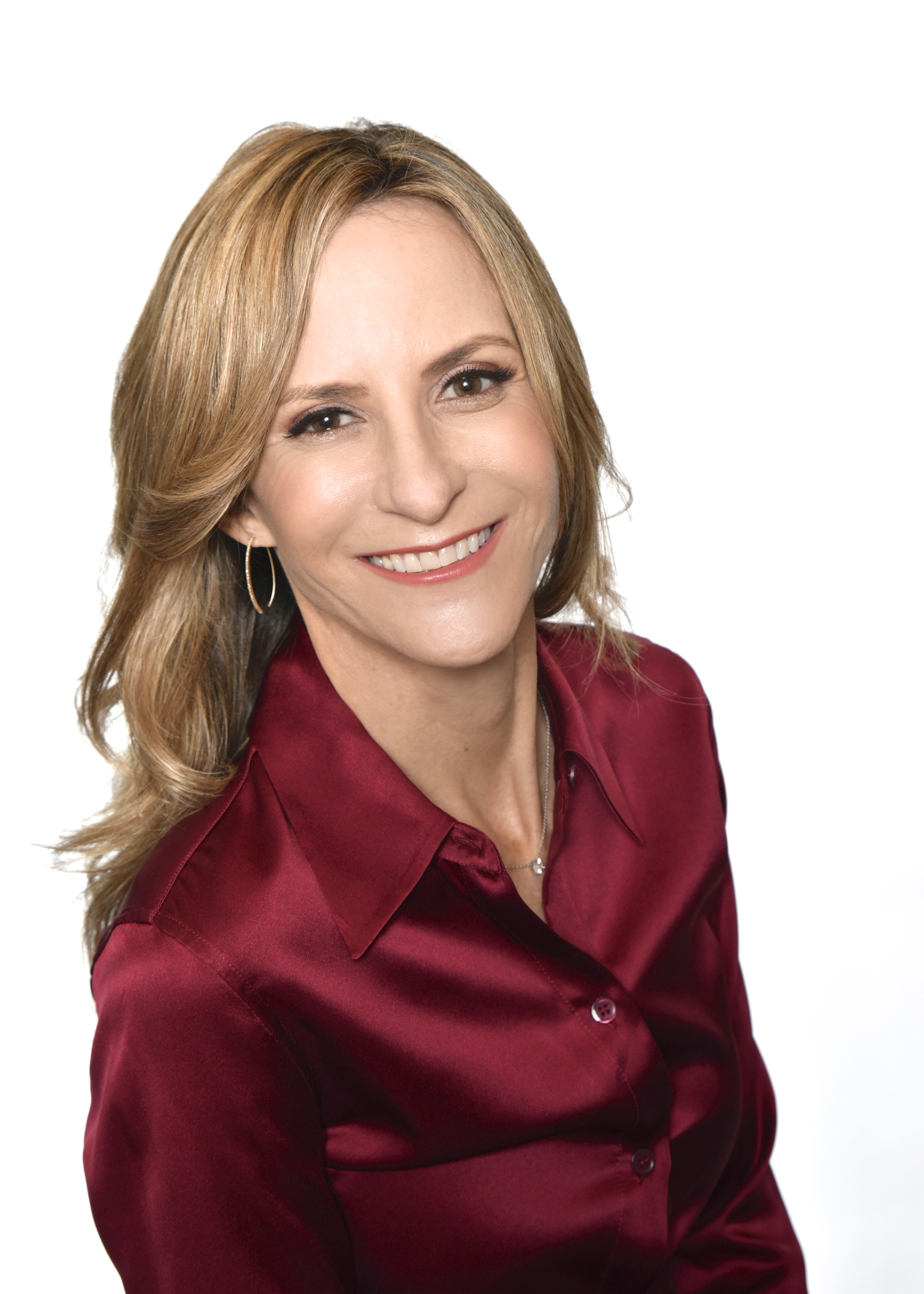
- Born: Las Cruces, NM
- Citizenship: United States
- Education: Texas Woman's University University of Colorado, Boulder Johns Hopkins School of Medicine
- Known for: Pain psychology and voluntary opioid reduction
- Scientific career
- Fields: Behavioral Medicine for Pain
- Workplaces: Stanford University
- Website: https://profiles.stanford.edu/beth-darnall

Beth Darnall is American scientist, pain psychologist, author, and Associate Professor of Anesthesiology, Perioperative and Pain Medicine at the Stanford University School of Medicine where she directs the Stanford Pain Relief Innovations Lab. From 2005 to 2012, Darnall was an assistant professor and associate professor at Oregon Health & Science University.

She is known for developing and investigating brief and scalable behavioral medicine treatments for acute, post-surgical and chronic pain, leading teams of investigators in the conduct of federally-funded randomized controlled clinical pain treatment trials, research on patient-centered voluntary prescription opioid tapering, advocacy for patient protections during opioid tapering, and vocal opposition of forced opioid tapering practices. She is creator of Empowered Relief(R), a 1-session (2 hour) pain relief skill intervention that has been shown to be non-inferior to 8-session cognitive behavioral therapy for reducing multiple symptoms at 3 months post-treatment (pain distress, pain intensity, pain interference, sleep disturbance, fatigue, depression and anxiety). The study publication was covered by the National Institutes of Health and multiple media outlets including The New York Times, MedPage Today and Physician's Weekly.

A study of online delivered Empowered Relief(R) in patients with different types of chronic pain showed multidimensional benefits across a range of outcomes at 3 months post-treatment (compared to a usual care control group). In 2019, the Health and Human Services Pain Task Force cited Empowered Relief as being an important and promising solution to address the unmet need of broad scale access to behavioral pain care in the U.S. Empowered Relief(R) is being delivered by more than 1,000 certified instructors in 25 countries and in 7 languages. Tailored versions of Empowered Relief(R) have been created for people with injury/surgery, opioid use disorder, Veterans, and youth with pain.

In 2018 she briefed the U.S. Congress on the opioid and pain crises, and in 2019 provided invited testimony to the FDA on iatrogenic harms from forced opioid tapering. Her work has been featured in Scientific American, NPR Radio, BBC Radio, and Nature. In 2018 she spoke on the psychology of pain relief at the World Economic Forum in Davos, Switzerland. Since 2019 she has served as Chief Science Advisor at AppliedVR, a virtual reality therapeutics company that published the first study reporting on at-home skills-based virtual reality for chronic pain treatment. Follow-on studies have included a randomized placebo-controlled trial of an 8-week home-based virtual reality program for chronic pain with clinical efficacy demonstrated to 24-months post-treatment.

In 2020 Darnall was appointed a scientific member of the National Institutes of Health (NIH) Interagency Pain Research Coordinating Committee (IPRCC) by U.S. Health and Human Services Secretary Dr. Alex Azar. In 2020, she was appointed to the Centers for Disease Control and Prevention (CDC) opioid workgroup, a group that is charged with reviewing the scientific evidence for acute and chronic pain opioid prescribing guidelines and making recommendations on the planned 2021 CDC opioid prescribing guideline. In 2021 Darnall was elected to the Board of Directors of the American Academy of Pain Medicine.

== Early life and education ==
Darnall graduated from Texas Woman's University with a B.A. in mass communications in 1994. She received her M.A. and Ph.D. in clinical psychology from the University of Colorado, Boulder in 1998 and 2002, respectively. She completed a post-doctoral fellowship in rehabilitation medicine at Johns Hopkins School of Medicine in 2004.

== Scientific research ==
Darnall is principal investigator for large NIH and PCORI-funded national and multi-site clinical trials that broadly investigate behavioral medicine strategies for acute and chronic pain, and voluntary patient-centered prescription opioid reduction.

== Author ==
Darnall is the author of over 100 journal articles.

She has authored three books:

1. Psychological Treatment for Patients with Chronic Pain
2. The Opioid-Free Pain Relief Kit: 10 Simple Steps to Ease Your Pain
3. Less Pain, Fewer Pills: Avoid the Dangers of Prescription Opioids and Gain Control Over Chronic Pain

She coauthored a fourth book with Heath McAnally and Lynn Freeman: Preoperative Optimization of the Chronic Pain Patient.

== Organizations ==
Darnall was the 2012 president of the Pain Society of Oregon.
