= Beth Ann Bauman =

American writer

Beth Ann Bauman is an American writer of fiction based in New York City. Bauman has published a collection of short stories, Beautiful Girls in 2003 (MacAdam/Cage), and a novel for young adults, Rosie and Skate in 2009. Her work has been published in The Barcelona Review and the anthology Many Lights in Many Windows and has also been nominated for a Pushcart Prize. She has also received fellowships from the New York Foundation of the Arts and the Jerome Foundation.

== Bibliography ==
- Beautiful Girls (2003) (Short stories)
- Rosie and Skate (2009) (Young adult novel)
