= Beth Comstock =

American business executive (born 1960)

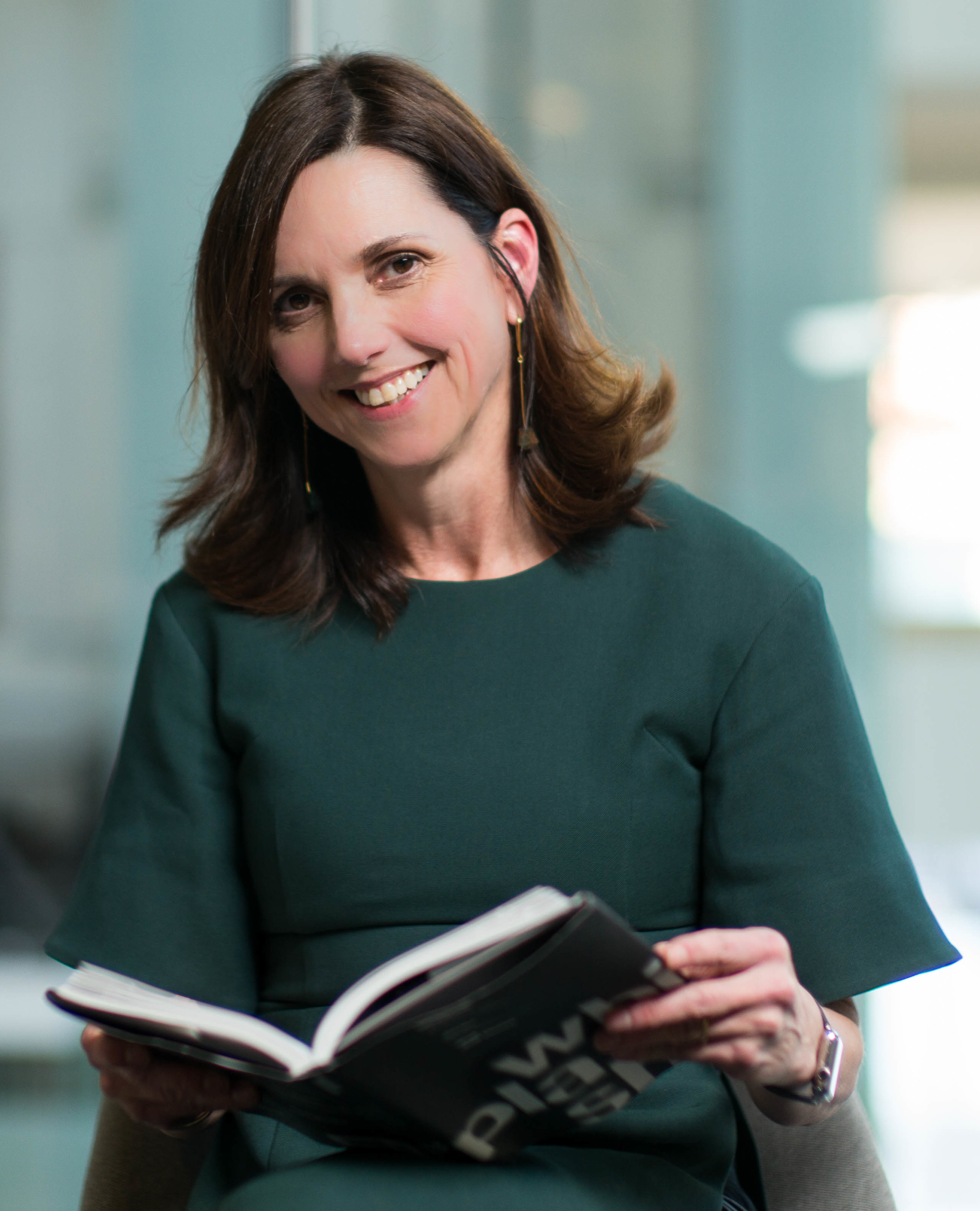
- Comstock in 2017
- Born: 1960 (age 65–66); Morgantown, West Virginia, U.S.
- Education: College of William and Mary (B.S.)
- Occupations: Vice Chair, General Electric (retired)
- Children: 2

Elizabeth Comstock (born 1960) is an American business executive. She is a former vice chair of General Electric. She operated GE Business Innovations, a division focused on new business and service models. This unit includes GE Lighting, Current, GE Ventures & Licensing and GE sales, marketing and communications.

== Early life and education ==
Comstock was born in 1960 in Morgantown, West Virginia, to a schoolteacher mother and a dentist father. She is the oldest of three children. Her family moved to the Shenandoah Valley in Virginia where she spent her primary school years. Comstock graduated from The College of William and Mary in 1982 with a Bachelor of Science in biology and a minor in anthropology.

== Career ==
=== Early Career and NBC ===
Motivated by a desire to 'tell stories about science,' Comstock interned at a public radio station before transitioning to local television reporting in Virginia and public-access television in Washington, D.C. In the mid-1980s, she joined NBC as a publicity coordinator. Following roles at CBS and Turner Broadcasting, she returned to NBC News to assist with a turnaround project in the wake of a fabricated-news scandal that had severely impacted the division.

In 2003, Comstock began serving as GE's chief marketing and commercial office. From 2006, she was President of Integrated Media at NBC Universal overseeing ad sales, marketing and research, and led the company's digital efforts including Peacock Equity, acquiring iVillage.com and oversaw the founding of Hulu. Comstock served as Vice Chair of GE from September 1, 2015, until October 6, 2017, when she stepped down as part of a broader executive reshuffle led by then-CEO John Flannery.

=== Late GE Era and Recognition ===
Comstock served as Vice Chair of GE from September 1, 2015, until October 6, 2017, when she stepped down as part of a broader executive reshuffle led by then-CEO John Flannery. During her tenure in this role, Forbes named her one of "The World's 100 Most Powerful Women" in 2015 and 2016.

=== Board Memberships and Post-GE Career ===
Alongside her corporate executive positions, Comstock has served on the board of directors for Nike, Inc. and as the trustee president of the Cooper Hewitt, Smithsonian Design Museum. Following her departure from GE, she co-authored her first book, Imagine It Forward: Courage, Creativity, and the Power of Change, which was published in September 2018. That same month, she was recognized on PRWeek's list of the "Top 20 Most Influential Communicators."
