= Beth Kempton =

British Japanologist, cultural coordinator, interpreter, and self-help author (born 1977)

Beth Kempton (born 6 May 1977) is a British Japanologist, cultural coordinator and interpreter for sporting events, and a self-help and life improvement author. Interested in accounting as a child, her involvement with the Tall Ships Races inspired her desire to travel abroad. This led her to study Japanese and interpretation, spending several decades in Japan as a cultural coordinator, television host, and a translation interpreter for multiple international sporting events. In the late 2010s, she began publishing self-help books and general philosophical reflections on Japanese wisdom.

== Early life and education ==
Born in Southampton, England, Kempton spent her early childhood wanting to be an accountant, including taking bookkeeping classes at 13. During her final year in high school, she was a competitor in that year's Tall Ships Races that traveled across to Spain. The experience made her want to go abroad instead of having a career in an office. She instead went to Durham University and studied Japanese for her undergraduate degree, as she wanted to travel somewhere different with an unknown language. For her first year, she was a part of the university's newspaper and radio station. The second year of her studies involved a study abroad where she stayed with a family in Kyoto, Japan and had to learn the local dialect. She later returned to the UK in 2003 to obtain a Master's degree in the fields of interpreting and translation from the University of Bath.

== Career ==
After graduating, Kempton became an international relations coordinator for the JET Programme and also hosted her own television show on Yamagata Television. In 1998 and 2003 for the IBSF World Championships, she served as an interpreter for the British team. She held a position at the 2002 FIFA World Cup in Tokyo and then a cultural coordinator for Peace Boat. In the early 2010s, Kempton started a company named Do What You Love that provides life improvement courses online. Kempton worked at the 2012 Summer Olympics in London and later was the manager for UNICEF's partnership with Manchester United. She also continues to hold wellness retreats through her company in the UK.

Her first published book in 2017, Freedom Seeker, was filled with her personal life lessons and her "unconventional decision-making process". Working on the book also helped her learn to enjoy the process of writing and led to her subsequent book in 2018, Wabi Sabi, that also combined her love for Japan with her life coach experiences. She described the philosophy of wabi sabi used in her book to be a combination of the Japanese words wabi, which means "finding beauty in simplicity", and sabi, which is the passage of time. This idea of enjoying impermanence and the ever-changing aesthetic of nature is described by Kempton as being a "pillar of wabi sabi". The book was later translated and published into 24 languages.

Kempton released a book for the holidays of 2019 titled Calm Christmas and a Happy New Year that discussed how to celebrate Christmas and other holiday seasons in a personal way, especially for those dealing with "sadness, loss and loneliness". She also made a podcast named Calm Christmas to tie into her book and which spoke on how to have a "stressfree holiday season". Her first book teaching creative writing, The Way of the Fearless Writer, was published in 2023 and utilized the Gates of Liberation techniques from Buddhism to explain how to write without being concerned about negative critique. The book was chosen by Publishers Weekly as one of its books of the week upon publication. She published an additional book around Japanese wisdom in 2024 titled Kokoro, based around the Japanese word about the heart and soul. The book discusses not only how to feel consciously connected to the world even when doing daily tasks, but also discusses spiritual activities done in Japan.

== Bibliography ==
- — (2017). Freedom Seeker: Live More. Worry Less. Do What You Love. Hay House. p. 304. ISBN 9781401968489.
- — (2018). Wabi Sabi: Japanese Wisdom for a Perfectly Imperfect Life. HarperCollins. p. 256. ISBN 9780062963451.
- — (2019). Calm Christmas and a Happy New Year: A Little Book of Festive Joy. Charles Scribner's Sons. p. 272. ISBN 9781982151874.
- — (2020). We Are In This Together: Finding Hope and Opportunity in the Depths of Adversity. Little, Brown Book Group. p. 112. ISBN 9780349427690.
- — (2023). The Way of the Fearless Writer: Mindful Wisdom for a Flourishing Writing Life. St. Martin's Publishing Group. p. 208. ISBN 9781250892140.
- — (2024). Kokoro: Japanese Wisdom for a Life Well Lived. Storey Publishing. p. 256. ISBN 9781635869316.
