= Beth Meyerson =

American professor

Beth E. Meyerson
- Meyerson in 2023
- Education: University of Michigan – BA, 1988; Christian Theological Seminary – MDiv., 1992; Saint Louis University – PhD, 2002
- Occupations: Professor, Author
- Notable work: Ready to Go: The History and Contributions of U.S. Public Health Advisors; (2008)

Beth E. Meyerson is an American professor at the University of Arizona with interest in public health. She is best known for her research on public health policy with focus on harm reduction and sexual health. She is the Beverly Benson McCord Endowed Professor of Nursing, Professor of Medicine, and Policy Director of the Comprehensive Center for Pain and Addiction at the University of Arizona.

Meyerson's research is oriented as translational to program and policy through the application of implementation science and community-based participatory action research (CBPAR). Examples of this include informing state legislation to decriminalize syringe possession and thus allowing syringe service programming in Indiana (Indiana Code § 16-41-7.5-5) and Arizona (House Bill 2839).

== Career ==
From 1994 until 1998 Meyerson was the state AIDS and STD director for Missouri, where she held positions on the board of directors for the National Alliance of State and Territorial AIDS Directors (NASTAD) and was a founding member of the National Coalition of STD Directors.

In 1998, she formed the Policy Resource Group, LLC; an international consultancy focused on sexual health with an emphasis on building community-government relationships to advance sexual health policy. During this time she completed a Ph.D. in Public Policy Analysis and Administration at the Saint Louis University, and served on an Institute of Medicine committee focused on the Ryan White CARE Act. The act, enacted in 1990 and named after the Indiana teen who paved the way for people with HIV to attend school, funds grants to states and communities to provide care and treatment to people with HIV.

In 2011, Meyerson joined the faculty of the Indiana University School of Public Health as a tenure track faculty member and was appointed as an associate professor with tenure in 2016. She also co-directed the Rural Center for AIDS/STD Prevention until 2019, and was affiliated with the Kinsey Institute and the Center for HPV Research. While at Indiana University, Meyerson and her community colleagues conducted research regarding an HIV outbreak among people who inject drugs. Her research with Indiana pharmacies paved the way for pharmacy-based interventions to reduce blood-borne infections and opioid overdoses. Meyerson was subsequently awarded a Bicentennial Professorship in 2018.

In 2019, Meyerson joined the faculty of the University of Arizona with the Southwest Institute for Research on Women in the College of Social and Behavioral Sciences. She was also affiliated with the School of Government and Public Policy, the Institute for LGBT Studies. In 2023, she joined the faculty of the Department of Family and Community Medicine in the College of Medicine.

Meyerson was a member of the national board of directors of Lambda Legal having served two terms, interrupted by residence in Switzerland from 2016-2018.

Meyerson currently serves on the national board of directors of the American Sexually Transmitted Disease Association (ASTDA) and on local boards of directors in Arizona. In 2024, she was appointed to the Arizona Substance Abuse Partnership (ASAP), which is the statewide council on substance abuse prevention, treatment, and recovery efforts. Authorized under Executive Order 2023-17.

In 2026, Meyerson was appointed to the National Methadone Access and Quality Commission, an initiative focused on improving access to and quality of methadone treatment for opioid use disorder.

== Research work ==
Meyerson has contributed book chapters, books and has published several articles focused on policy and systems issues in public health, sexual health and harm reduction. Meyerson's Harm Reduction Research Lab produced several papers documenting the need and opportunities for expansion of sexual health and harm reduction interventions in Indiana. This work contributed to the passage of Indiana's syringe access law in 2015.

Meyerson has published numerous papers documenting the need for syringe access to reduce blood-borne infections among people who inject drugs in Arizona, healthcare provider abuse of people who use drugs, issues with layperson naloxone access and need for substance use treatment system reform. She has contributed to the statewide effort to decriminalize syringe access in Arizona and decriminalize fentanyl testing strips. In 2020 she established a statewide Drug Policy Research and Advocacy Board (DPRAB), a transdisciplinary group of people who provide medication for opioid use disorder (MOUD), people who are MOUD patients, people who have lived/living drug use experience, government partners, harm reduction organizations and payors. Together with her lab faculty (with members across 7 U.S. universities), the DPRAB advances harm reduction science and produced the first instrument to measure structural indicators of Community Based Participatory Action Research (SI-CBPAR).

In 2025, Meyerson co-authored a research protocol for Methadone Patient Access to Collaborative Treatment (MPACT), a project designed to evaluate approaches to improving methadone treatment practices and patient retention.

== Publications ==
=== Books ===
- Ready to Go: The History and Contributions of U.S. Public Health Advisor. American Social Health Association. 21 August 2008. ISBN 978-0-615-20383-6.
- Poppy's Combine. Beth Meyerson. (3 January 2012), ISBN 978-0-615-56775-4.

=== Chapters ===
- Zimet GD, Meyerson BE, Dutta T, Forster A, Corcoran B, Hanley S (2019). Political and public responses to HPV screening and vaccination. In Jenkins D and Bosch X. Human papillomavirus: Proving and using a viral cause for cancer. London: Elsevier.
- Crosby, RA. & Meyerson, BE (2012). Prevention counseling and condom use instruction: Opportunities for STI clinics. In J. Zenilman and M. Shahmanesh (Eds.) Sexually Transmitted Infections: Diagnosis, Management, and Treatment. Burlington, MA: Jones and Bartlett Publishers.
