= Beth Kaplan =

Canadian writer, teacher, and actor (born 1950)

- Born: Elizabeth Kaplan; 1 August 1950; New York City, United States
- Occupations: Writer, Teacher
- Relatives: Jacob Gordin (great-grandfather)

Beth Kaplan (born 1 August 1950) is a Canadian writer, teacher, and actor.

== Early life ==
Kaplan began her professional acting career in 1970, with a school touring production for Toronto's Young People's Theatre. [1] She attended LAMDA, one of the "big three" theatre schools in London, England, and worked as an actor primarily in Vancouver. After appearing in nine tours, including one national tour, she left the stage in 1980 to earn an MFA in creative writing at the University of British Columbia.

She taught personal essay and memoir writing at Toronto Metropolitan University (previously Ryerson University) from 1994 to 2020, and in 2007 began teaching also at the University of Toronto, where in 2012 she won the Excellence in Teaching Award and where she teaches still. A fellow of the Banff Centre's Literary Journalism program, she produces So True, [2] a curated and rehearsed reading series every October for her long-term students and herself, at the Black Swan. A board and conference committee member of the Creative Nonfiction Collective, [3] she gave memoir writing workshops for CNFC, at the San Miguel Writers' Conference in Mexico and the Kingston WritersFest, and at many Toronto and nearby libraries and organizations.

== Career ==
Through the nineties, Kaplan had scores of essays published in newspapers and magazines and on CBC radio. Her first book,Finding the Jewish Shakespeare: The Life and Legacy of Jacob Gordin, a biography of her great-grandfather, was published in 2006 and reissued in paperback in 2012. It was called "a witty, shrewd, elegant book which tells a story of vital importance" by Tony Kushner. She spoke about the book across Canada, four times in New York including at the 92nd Street Y, in other American cities, in French in Paris, and at Oxford University. In 2008 she delivered the annual Wexler Lecture in Jewish History in Washington, D.C.

Her memoir All My Loving: Coming of Age with Paul McCartney in Paris, and her textbook on creative writing True to Life: 50 Steps to Help You Tell Your Story, appeared in 2014.

Her memoir Loose Woman, published in 2020, is the story of her fraught years as an actress through the seventies and particularly the year 1979, when living and working with men with disabilities in France changed her life.

Her most recent book, the memoir-in-essays Midlife Solo: writing through chaos to find my place in the world, is a compilation of often published essays about her midlife years. It was reviewed as "An extraordinary life, written with tremendous heart, insight and humour."

== Personal life ==
Kaplan is the great-granddaughter of the Yiddish playwright Jacob Gordin, the daughter of Canadian scientist and activist Dr. J. Gordin Kaplan, and the niece of the American bridge champion, Edgar Kaplan. She has two children and two grandchildren and has lived in the same house in downtown Toronto for forty years.
