= Beth Cuthand =

First Nations writer

Beth Cuthand is a First Nations writer. She was born a member of the Little Pine First Nation in Saskatchewan and has lived in the four western provinces of Canada. She is the author of Voices in the Waterfall, a collection of poetry and prose published by Theytus Press in 2008. She is also an editor of Reinventing the Enemy's Language: Contemporary Native Women's Writings of North America and co-author of The Little Duck: Sikihpsis, a Cree/English children's book published in 2007.

== Career and publications ==
Cuthand worked as a journalist for 16 years before moving into education. She has taught at the Saskatchewan Indian Federated College (now First Nations University) from 1986 to 1992. She has also taught at En'Owkin International School of Writing in Penticton, British Columbia, and the Nicola Valley Institute of Technology in Merrit, BC. She earned a Bachelor of Arts in Sociology from the University of Saskatchewan and an MFA in creative writing from the University of Arizona. She was a writer-in-residence at Kenyon College in Gambier, Ohio in 1993.

Cuthand's books of poetry include Horse Dance to Emerald Mountain (1987) and Voices in the Waterfall (1989, revised 2008).

She has written for anthologies and magazines, including An Anthology of Canadian Native Literature in English, 2nd ed: Native Poetry in Canada.

Cuthand has also published a children's book, Little Duck: Sikihpsis, with Stan Cuthand and illustrated by Mary Longman. The book is a bilingual Cree-English work about a duck wanting to be a Plains Cree Dancer.
