= Beth Levin =

Beth Levin may refer to:

- Beth Levin (linguist) (born 1955), American linguist
- Beth Levin (musician) (born 1950), American pianist
