= Beth Brooke-Marciniak =

American businesswoman (born 1959)

- Born: 1959 (age 66–67); Kokomo, Indiana, U.S.
- Education: Purdue University, West; Lafayette
- Political party: Democratic
- Spouse(s): Michelle Marciniak (2014– present)

Beth Brooke-Marciniak (born 1959) is the Global Vice Chair of Public Policy for EY (Ernst & Young). She is also EY's global sponsor for Diversity and Inclusiveness and a prominent advocate for the benefits of inclusive leadership and growth. In 2014, she was listed as the 98th most powerful woman in the world by Forbes.

She previously worked in the U.S. Department of the Treasury for two years where she worked on tax policies in insurance and managed care. Brooke is also a member of the Audit Advisory Committee for the U.S. Department of Defense, is a member of the U.S. delegation to the 53rd and 54th United Nations Commission on the Status of Women, and serves as a Pathways Envoy for the U.S. State Department.

== Education ==
Brooke was the first woman to be awarded a basketball scholarship by Purdue University, from which she earned a bachelor's degree in industrial management/computer science in 1981 and received an honorary degree in 2012.
