= Beth L. Parker =

Hydrogeologist

- Education: Allegheny College, Duke University, University of Waterloo
- Awards: American Geophysical Union and Canadian Academy of Engineering Fellow
- Scientific career
- Fields: Hydrogeology
- Workplaces: University of Guelph, Morwick G360 Groundwater Research Institute, The University Consortium
- Thesis: Effects of molecular diffusion on the persistence of dense, immiscible phase organic liquids in fractured porous geologic media (1996)

Beth L. Parker is a hydrogeologist and professor at the University of Guelph who has made contributions to the science and practice of contaminant hydrogeology and the protection of groundwater from contamination. She has developed novel downhole borehole devices and procedures used for monitoring bedrock aquifers at complex contamination sites worldwide. She also holds 3 patents and more than 180 refereed papers. She is the most cited Canadian under the age of 65 for papers concerning groundwater contamination. Parker is the director/founder of Morwick G360 Groundwater Research Institute located at the University of Guelph and the associate director of The University Consortium.

== Education and career ==
Parker has an undergraduate degree in from Allegheny College in environmental science and economics, as well as a masters degree from Duke University in environmental engineering. Parker began her career working in New York on industrial contaminants in groundwater, particularly in glacial and bedrock sediments. She earned her Ph.D. in 1996 from the University of Waterloo in hydrogeology where she worked on organic liquids found in porous rocks. Following her Ph.D. she remained at the University of Waterloo as a research professor until she joined the faculty at the University of Guelph in 2004.

Parker is the director and founder of the Morwick G360 Groundwater Research Institute in which she works alongside John A. Cherry in leading a field-focused research institute with the mission to provide new technologies to further protect underground water supplies. The institute is funded on average of 5 million dollars per year with contributions from governments, multi-national corporations, and big industry members and includes 17 principal investigators (consisting of professors from the University of Guelph and the University of Waterloo) as well as more than 150 graduate students.

== Research ==
Parker's research center, the Morwick G360 Groundwater Research Institute, was established in 2007. The research institute examines diffusion and the adverse impacts of the movement of contaminants in groundwater, with implications for the remediation of groundwater contaminants. This research includes investigations into dense non-aqueous phase liquids (abbreviated DNAPL), or liquids not miscible with water. She has investigated how contaminants such as tetrachloroethylene can be tracked in groundwater and how they can potentially be removed from aquifers. Her research also includes tracking human viruses in groundwater, and the persistence of methane gas in groundwater which would be explosive if people extract groundwater containing methane from the subsurface.

=== Patents ===
Parker currently holds three active patents as of March 2024, all related to groundwater remediation technologies, emphasizing her contributions to innovative solutions for environmental issues.

- US 6274048 "System for alleviating DNAPL contamination in groundwater"
- US 5641020 "Treatment of contaminated water in clays and the like"

== Selected publications ==
- Parker, Beth L.; Cherry, John A.; Chapman, Steven W. (October 2004). "Field study of TCE diffusion profiles below DNAPL to assess aquitard integrity". Journal of Contaminant Hydrology. 74 (1–4): 197–230. Bibcode:2004JCHyd..74..197P. doi:10.1016/j.jconhyd.2004.02.011. PMID 15358493.
- Parker, Beth L.; Chapman, Steven W.; Guilbeault, Martin A. (November 2008). "Plume persistence caused by back diffusion from thin clay layers in a sand aquifer following TCE source-zone hydraulic isolation". Journal of Contaminant Hydrology. 102 (1–2): 86–104. Bibcode:2008JCHyd.102...86P. doi:10.1016/j.jconhyd.2008.07.003. PMID 18775583.
- Chapman, Steven W.; Parker, Beth L. (December 2005). "Plume persistence due to aquitard back diffusion following dense nonaqueous phase liquid source removal or isolation: PLUME PERSISTENCE DUE TO BACK DIFFUSION". Water Resources Research. 41 (12). doi:10.1029/2005WR004224.
- Parker, Beth L.; Gillham, Robert W.; Cherry, John A. (September 1994). "Diffusive Disappearance of Immiscible-Phase Organic Liquids in Fractured Geologic Media". Ground Water. 32 (5): 805–820. Bibcode:1994GrWat..32..805P. doi:10.1111/j.1745-6584.1994.tb00922.x.

== Awards and honors ==
- Named Natural Sciences and Engineering Research Council of Canada Industrial Research Chair (2007)
- John Hem Award, National Ground Water Association (2009)
- M. King Hubbert Award, National Ground Water Association (2018)
- Fellow, American Geophysical Union in the Hydrology Section (2019)
- Fellow, Canadian Academy of Engineering (2021)
- Tage Erlander Visiting Professorship with the Swedish Research Council & Lund University (2021)
- Farvolden Award from the Canadian Chapter of the International Association of Hydrogeologists (2021)
- O.E. Meinzer Award, Geological Society of America's Hydrology Division (2022)
- NSERC Synergy Award for Innovation (2023)
- Member, National Academy of Engineering (2025)
