= Beth Koigi =

Kenyan entrepreneur working on affordable water access

Beth Koigi is a Kenyan entrepreneur working to improve the access of water for off-grid communities. Koigi is a founder of Majik Water, a company which aims to harvest drinking water from the air to serve communities across the world who are not able to access safe, clean drinking water. The equipment works on the same principle as the condensate type of dehumidifiers, causing the water vapor that is normally found in air to condense into its liquid form.

== Early life ==
Koigi was born in Kimende in Kiambu County.

== Education and career ==
Koigi earned a Bachelor of Science in Community Development, Project Planning and Management from Chuka University, Kenya (Class of 2013), and a Masters in Project Planning and Management from the University of Nairobi (Class of 2017).

Following her bachelor's degree, she was a founder of Aqua Clean Initiative, founded in 2013. Koigi was awarded the Young Water Fellowship in September, 2018, and has been a current associate fellow of the Royal Commonwealth Society, Nordic Baltic Hub since April 2015. Additionally, Koigi is a Grant Advisor for The Pollination Project since December 2015. Koigi is currently a founding member of Majik Water, which was founded in July 2017. Majik Water won the EDF Pulse Award Africa in 2017, and Koigi was a shortlisted contender for the Royal Academy of Engineering Africa prize 2019. She appeared at TEDxFasoKanu in 2019.
