= Beth Overmoyer =

American physician and oncologist

- Education: Case Western Reserve University
- Scientific career
- Workplaces: Hospital of the University of Pennsylvania; Dana–Farber Cancer Institute; Harvard Medical School

Beth Ann Overmoyer (born 1960) is an American physician and oncologist. She is Director of the Inflammatory Breast Cancer Program at the Dana–Farber Cancer Institute.

== Early life and education ==
Overmoyer was an undergraduate student in biology and graduated magna cum laude. She was a medical student at the Case Western Reserve University, before moving to the University of Pennsylvania for her internship and medical residency. She became interested in oncology in the late eighties, when she started researching breast cancer at the Hospital of the University of Pennsylvania.

== Research and career ==
Overmoyer was appointed to the Cleveland Clinic, where she was made the hospital director of breast cancer. She dedicated her career to breast cancer prevention and the treatment of early-stage disease. Alongside leading several clinical trials, early in her career she was involved with a review into the United States Department of Defense funding for breast cancer research. She was one of the first to demonstrate high dose chemotherapy – autologous stem-cell transplantation to treat metastatic carcinoma.

In 2007, Overmoyer moved to the Dana–Farber Cancer Institute, where she established the Inflammatory Breast Cancer Program in 2009. Inflammatory breast cancer is a rare, fast-growing disease, which causes the lymph vessels within breast skins to become clogged with tumor cells. Overmoyer established the Inflammatory Breast Cancer Registry, a repository of information and tumor samples to aid with the understanding and diagnosis of the disease. She showed that Ruxolitinib was capable of suppressing the inflammatory breast cancer pathway in patients with triple-negative breast cancer.

Overmoyer studied the clinical benefits of Enobosarm (an androgen receptor modulator) in patients with androgen receptor positive and estrogen receptor positive breast cancer. She found that Enobosarm was well tolerated, safe and showed clinical benefit.

She is also an assistant professor of medicine and Harvard Medical School.

== Selected publications ==
- Kathy D Miller; Linnea I Chap; Frankie A Holmes; et al. (1 February 2005). "Randomized phase III trial of capecitabine compared with bevacizumab plus capecitabine in patients with previously treated metastatic breast cancer". Journal of Clinical Oncology. 23 (4): 792–799. doi:10.1200/jco.2005.05.098. ISSN 0732-183X. PMID 15681523. Wikidata Q36024588.
- Howard A Burris; Herbert I Hurwitz; E Claire Dees; et al. (10 August 2005). "Phase I safety, pharmacokinetics, and clinical activity study of lapatinib (GW572016), a reversible dual inhibitor of epidermal growth factor receptor tyrosine kinases, in heavily pretreated patients with metastatic carcinomas". Journal of Clinical Oncology. 23 (23): 5305–13. doi:10.1200/jco.2005.16.584. ISSN 0732-183X. PMID 15955900. Wikidata Q28256478.
- "Adjuvant Paclitaxel and Trastuzumab for Node-Negative, HER2-Positive Breast Cancer". The New England Journal of Medicine. 373 (20): 1989. 1 November 2015. doi:10.1056/nejmx150037. ISSN 0028-4793. PMID 26559595. Wikidata Q86680692.
