= Beth Killoran =

American information technology executive and civil servant

- Education: University of Maryland, Baltimore County; University of Maryland University College (M.S.)
- Occupation: Deputy CIO of the General Services Administration

Beth Anne Killoran is an American information technology executive and civil servant. She is the deputy chief information officer (CIO) of the General Services Administration. Killoran was previously the CIO of the United States Department of Health and Human Services.

== Education ==
Killoran completed a B.A. in psychology with a certificate in personnel management at the University of Maryland, Baltimore County. She earned a M.S. in technology management from the University of Maryland University College.

== Career ==
=== United States Department of Homeland Security ===
Killoran joined the United States Department of Homeland Security (DHS) in 2004. She headed the DHS infrastructure transformation program, enterprise talent management system, and the office of program accountability and risk management. She also worked for the DHS undersecretary for management, office of the chief information officer, United States Citizenship and Immigration Services, and U.S. Customs and Border Protection.

=== United States Department of Health and Human Services ===
Killoran joined the United States Department of Health and Human Services (HHS) in October 2014. In December 2015, HHS named Killoran as the acting deputy assistant secretary for information technology and the acting chief information officer (CIO), succeeding Frank Baitman. In July 2016, Mary Wakefield announced that Killoran was promoted from acting CIO to the permanent CIO. Killoran simultaneously served as the acting deputy CIO and executive director of the office of IT strategy, policy, and governance. As the HHS CIO, she updated the office's strategic plan and worked to implement cloud adoption. Killoran oversaw a reorganization of the CIO's office to promote innovation and named Todd Simpson as the inaugural chief product officer. In August 2018, Killoran was reassigned to the Office of the Surgeon General to develop an information systems strategic plan for the United States Public Health Service Commissioned Corps. She was succeeded by Ed Simcox as the acting HHS CIO.

=== General Services Administration ===
Killoran joined the General Services Administration (GSA) on November 13, 2018, as its deputy CIO. From April 2020 through November 2020, Killoran worked as the acting GSA chief data officer following the resignation of Kris Rowley. She was succeed in this role by Payman Sadegh.
