= Beth Clark =

New Zealand footballer

Personal information
- Full name: Elizabeth Clark
- Date of birth: 26 May 1972 (age 54)
- Position: Defender

International career
Years	Team	Apps	(Gls)
1996	New Zealand	1	(0)

Elizabeth Clark (born 26 May 1972) is a former association football player who represented New Zealand at international level.

Clark made a single appearance for Football Ferns in a 1–1 draw with Papua New Guinea on 7 November 1996.
