= Beth Catlin =

American autistic savant

Elizabeth "Beth" Catlin (born September 22, 1958) is an American autistic savant who sends birthday cards to people whom she has met. Using only her memory, Catlin can recall the names, birthdates, and addresses of the people she has met. As of July 2009, Catlin sends birthday cards each year to 3,834 people.

== Personal life ==
Beth Catlin was born on September 22, 1958, to Don and Barb Catlin. She has a younger sister. She lived with her parents in Mechanicsburg, Cumberland County, Pennsylvania. After her father died around 2009, she continued living with her mother in Mechanicsburg.

In 1995, she worked at a low-paying assembly line job at the Center for Industrial Training, where she could interact with other developmentally disabled people. According to Reader's Digest, Catlin is "mentally and emotionally challenged". Barbara Catlin told The Patriot-News about her daughter in 1995, "We can't reason with her. She just doesn't have that capacity." Although Catlin is a savant, she "has never mastered things like simple household chores, shopping and personal relationship". As of 2009, she finances her birthday card undertaking through her job at S. Wilson Pollock Center for Industrial Training, a vocational training program for disabled people.

== Birthday cards ==
In 1972, Catlin started sending birthday cards to people she has met. She sends cards to her family and friends, as well as neighbors and people at church. She asks people for their name, address, and birthdate, and then catalogs the information in her head. The cards she sends have never been returned due to a wrong address, and the spellings and birthdates have never been in error. She makes the cards every day after dinner for everyone she has met as well as those people's friends and family even if she has not seen them before. In October 1995, Catlin sent birthday cards to roughly 1,400 people. In July 2009, Catlin sent birthday cards each year to 3,834 people. By 2019, that number had grown to around 5,000.

Catlin's cards are decorated with birthday balloons. Written in colored pencil, all her cards have the message, "Happy Birthday". She funds the card-sending with her job at the S. Wilson Pollock Center for Industrial Training. On Catlin's birthday, she receives over 200 birthday cards from the people in her birthday circle. Many of these cards have presents of stamps.

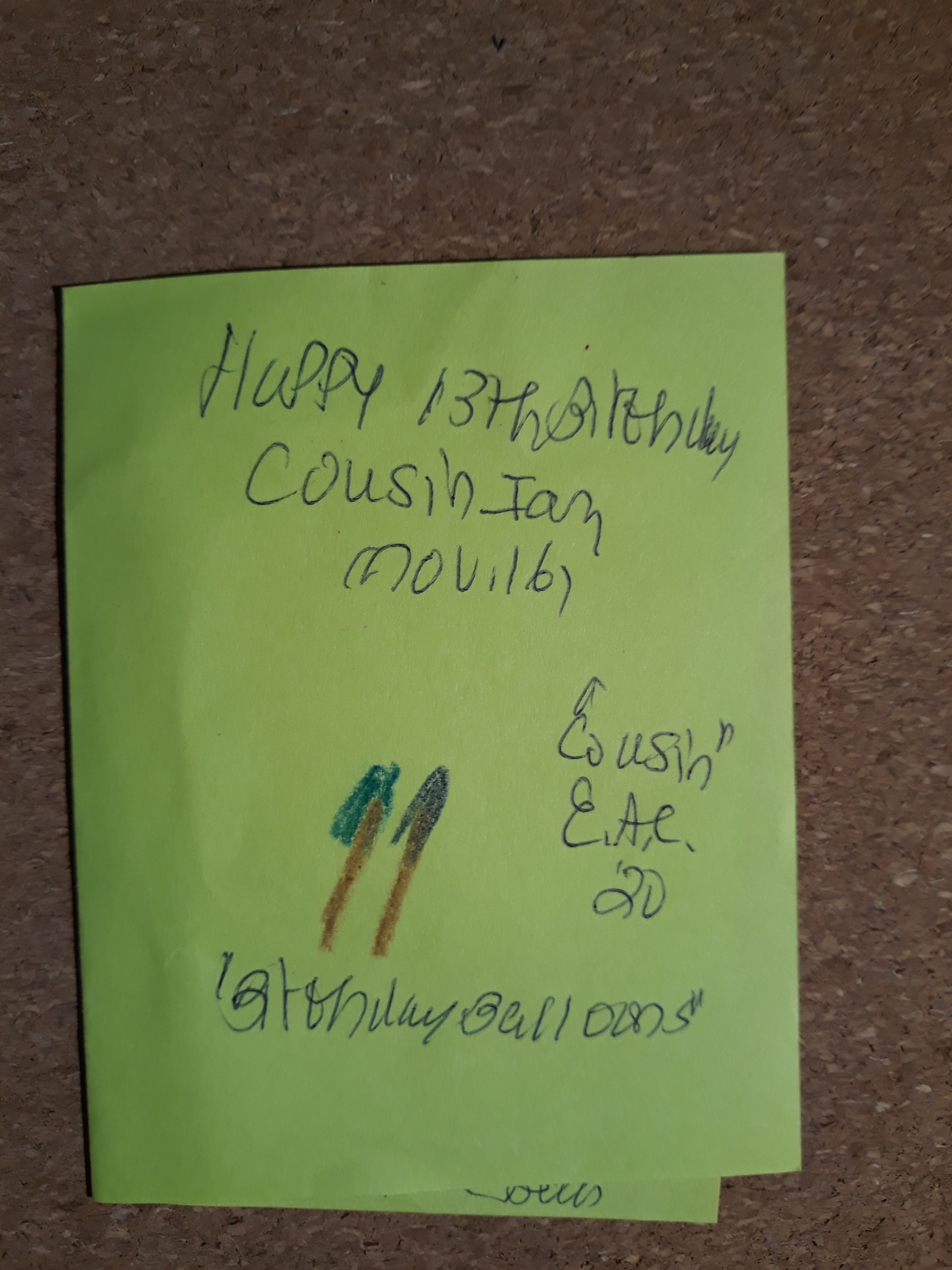
A 13th birthday card sent by Catlin to her cousin in 2021.

In the July 2009 issue of Reader's Digest, Catlin was named "Best Birthday Wisher" in RD's "Best of America" feature. The Philadelphia Inquirer columnist Ronnie Polaneczky wrote in 2019, "Beth's obsession with digits is similar to the kind so unforgettably personified by Dustin Hoffman in the movie Rain Man. While her gift is not an uncommon one among 'number' savants such as herself, I find it immensely moving that it manifests itself in such a thoughtful way."
