= Beth Sulzer-Azaroff =

American psychologist (1929–2022)

- Born: September 6, 1929
- Died: February 26, 2022 (aged 92)
- Occupations: Psychologist; Behavior Analyst
- Spouse: Edward Sulzer
- Awards: OBM Network Life Achievement Award (1991); ABAI Fred S. Keller Award (1997)

Academic background
- Education: City College of New York; University of Minnesota

Beth Sulzer-Azaroff (September 6, 1929 – February 26, 2022) was a psychologist and pioneering figure in the field of behavior analysis. She conducted research on organizational behavior management and promoted the use of applied behavior analysis for teaching children with autism. The Federation of Associations in Behavioral & Brain Sciences noted her contributions as "instrumental in translating findings from the basic behavior analytic laboratory to the applied setting, from the classroom to the factory."

Sulzer-Azaroff was recipient of a Lifetime Achievement Award from the OBM Network in 1991, and received the Association for Behavior Analysis International (ABAI) Fred S. Keller Behavioral Education Award for distinguished contributions in 1997. In 2004, Sulzer-Azaroff received the Distinguished Service to Behavior Analysis Award from the Society for the Advancement of Behavior Analysis.

== Biography ==
Sulzer-Azaroff grew up in Washington Heights, New York City. From the time she was a child, she knew she wanted to be a teacher. Though her family could not afford to pay for college, the City University of New York funded free colleges at the time. Sulzer-Azaroff completed her B.S. degree in elementary education and teaching (1946–1950), and her M.A. degree in elementary education and teaching (1950–1953) at City College of New York. She subsequently attended graduate school at the University of Minnesota (1961–1966), where she obtained her masters/Ph.D. in psychology.

Sulzer-Azaroff taught educational psychology for 5 years (1966–1972) as an associate professor at Southern Illinois University. She then moved to the University of Massachusetts Amherst (1973–1992), where she held the position of professor of psychology, and she taught applied behavior analysis, organizational behavior management, educational psychology, and other courses. Sulzer-Azaroff served as the president of the ABAI (1981–1982) and was the first woman to hold that position. Sulzer-Azaroff also served as president of the American Psychological Association (APA) Division 25, and the Berkshire Association for Behavioral Analysis.

Sulzer-Azaroff was married to psychologist Edward Sulzer from 1955 until his death in 1970. They had three children together. She was married to Leonid Azaroff from 1972 until his death in 2014. Sulzer-Azaroff died on February 26, 2022, in Naples, Florida.

== Research ==
Sulzer-Azaroff and her colleague G. Roy Mayer wrote a series of texts on behavior analysis, which covered fundamental techniques and strategies for promoting behavior change. Behavior analysis can be implemented with varying degrees of skill and responsibility. Responsible behavior analysts must know how to select goals, objectives, measures, and procedures ethically and legally and how to use them appropriately.

Sulzer-Azaroff and her colleagues conducted research to evaluate the effectiveness of peer incidental teaching as a strategy for increasing peer interactions among children with autism. There were three targeted students that showed positive effects of this intervention. Another study focused on whether preschool-age children with autistic like-behaviors would learn to engage in pretend play activities targeted at developmentally appropriate and age appropriate levels, and reported limited success in teaching the children the more difficult age-appropriate skills.

With Julie B. Schweitzer, Sulzer-Azaroff conducted research on self control in boys with attention deficit hyperactivity disorder (ADHD). They observed that boys with ADHD were more likely to choose rewards that they could get immediately, rather than wait for larger rewards. This preference was exacerbated when the boys were more active. In another study, the authors reported that children could learn to prefer the larger reward following training, which consisted of gradually increasing the durations of the delay interval over many sessions. This procedure, which led to an increase in the selection of larger, more advantageous reinforcers, over smaller immediate reinforcers, demonstrated the malleability of a key aspect of self-control in children. With G. Roy Mayer, Tom Butterworth, and Mary Nafpaktitis, Sulzer-Azaroff designed a training and consultation program to address the problem of vandalism in school settings through staff development, aimed at creating a more positive school environment. The team had school personnel attend workshops on behavioral strategies to reduce vandalism and disruptive student behavior. The results showed a decrease in vandalism and rates of disruptive students across a three-year period in 18 elementary and junior high schools.

== Books ==
- Bony, A., & Sulzer-Azaroff, B. (2002). The pyramid approach to education in autism. Pyramid Educational Products.
- Sulzer-Azaroff, B. (1999). Who killed my daddy? A behavioral safety fable. Cambridge Center for Behavioral Studies.
- Sulzer-Azaroff, B., Dyer, K., Dupont, S., & Soucy, D. (2012). Applying behavior analysis across the autism spectrum: A field guide for practitioners. Sloan Publishing, LLC.
- Sulzer-Azaroff, B., & Mayer, G. R. (1977). Applying behavior analysis procedures with children and youth. Holt, Rinehart, and Winston.
- Sulzer-Azaroff, B., & Mayer, G. R. (1986). Achieving educational excellence: Using behavioral strategies. Holt Rinehart & Winston.
- Sulzer-Azaroff, B., & Mayer, G. R. (1991). Behavior analysis for lasting change. Holt, Rinehart & Winston.

== Representative publications ==
- Alavosius, M. P., & Sulzer-Azaroff, B. (1986). The effects of performance feedback on the safety of client lifting and transfer. Journal of Applied Behavior Analysis, 19(3), 261-267.
- Alavosius, M. P., & Sulzer-Azaroff, B. (1990). Acquisition and maintenance of health-care routines as a function of feedback density. Journal of Applied Behavior Analysis, 23(2), 151-162.
- Babcock, R. A., Sulzer-Azaroff, B., Sanderson, M., & Scibak, J. (1992). Increasing nurses' use of feedback to promote infection-control practices in a head-injury treatment center. Journal of Applied Behavior Analysis, 25(3), 621-627.
- Lifter, K., Sulzer-Azaroff, B., Anderson, S. R., & Cowdery, G. E. (1993). Teaching play activities to preschool children with disabilities: The importance of developmental considerations. Journal of Early Intervention, 17(2), 139-159.
- Sulzer-Azaroff, B., & Austin, J. (2000). Does BBS work? Behavior-based safety & injury reduction: A survey of the evidence. Professional Safety, 45(7), 19-24.
