= Beth Ashley =

American author and columnist (1926–2020)

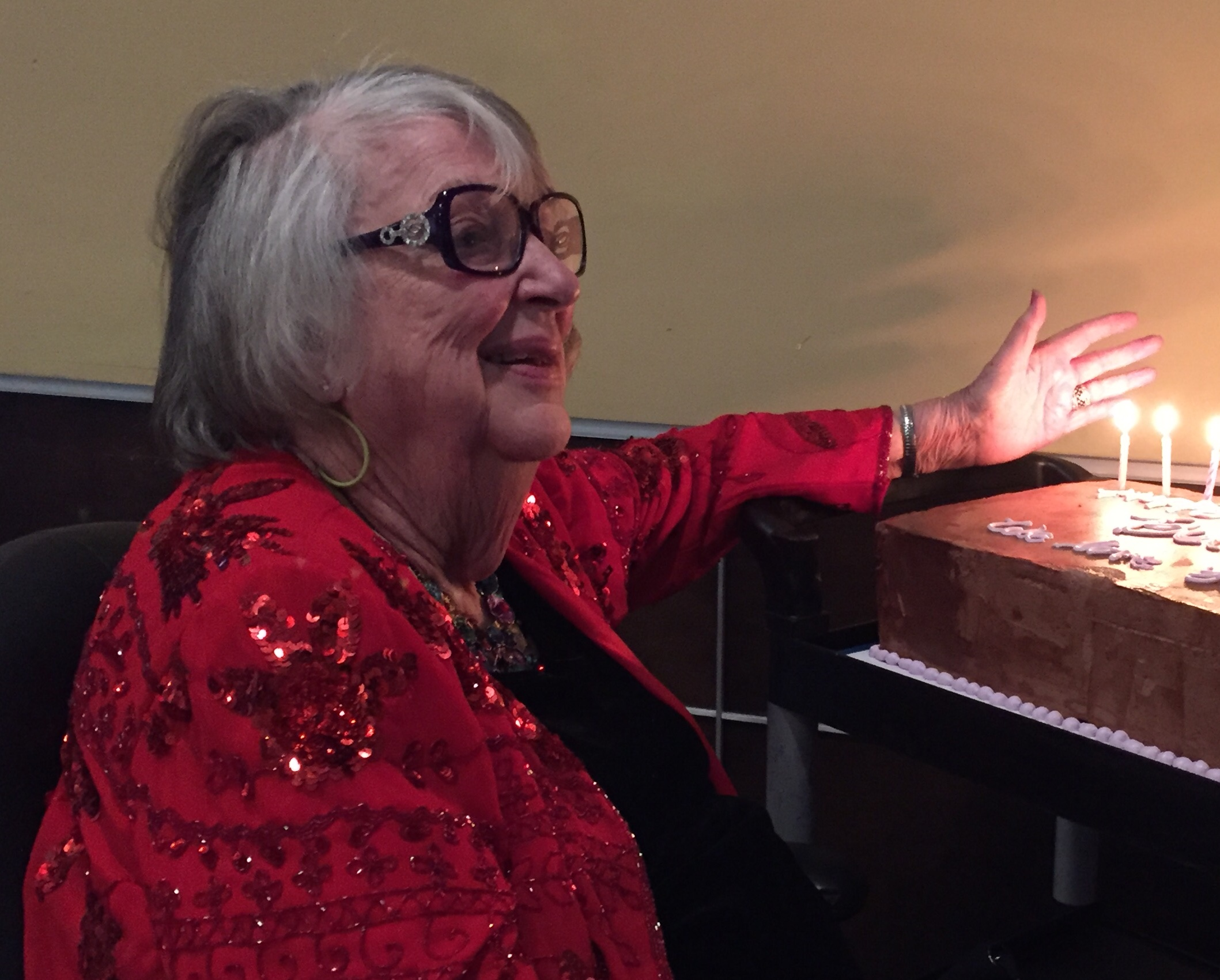
- Ashley at her 90th birthday
- Born: May 21, 1926; United States
- Died: May 1, 2020 (aged 93); Corte Madera, California, U.S.
- Education: Stanford University
- Occupations: Columnist, author
- Spouse: Roland Fellows
- Writing career
- Language: English

Beth Ashley (May 21, 1926 – May 1, 2020) was an American author and columnist. She wrote for the Marin Independent Journal for over 60 years. In remarks before the United States House of Representatives, Congresswoman Lynn Woolsey stated "Beth Ashley's work has expressed the heart and soul of Marin County."

== Early years ==
Beth Ashley was raised in Cambridge, Massachusetts. Her father was an investment banker, who moved Ashley and her family to Belvedere, California in order to assist in running a shipyard in Marin County in August 1941. She was enrolled in Tamalpais High School in 1942 and 1943.

Ashley was an alumna of Stanford University, where she was the editor of the campus newspaper, the Stanford Daily, and graduated with a major in journalism in 1946.

== Career ==
She moved to Paris, and later worked for a magazine, and for the United States Department of State as a public affairs officer in Germany in 1949. She joined the staff of the Marin Independent Journal in 1951, and wrote over 1200 columns for the newspaper.

Ashley not only focused her writing on life in Marin County, but also on her wide-ranging travels outside the US, including Afghanistan, Russia, and Iran.

She is the subject of a tribute by Congresswoman Lynn Woolsey placed in the Congressional Record. Woolsey praised Ashley's "passionate and thoughtful writing that has made her a community institution."

== Books ==
Ashley was the author of two books, one being a compilation of her columns for the Marin IJ titled Since You Asked, the name of her long-running column. A book on Marin County titled Marin, with photos by Hal Lauritzen, was released in 1993.

== Personal life ==
She raised five sons, from two marriages, and lived in Greenbrae, California from 1959. She married retired IBM engineer Roland Fellows in 2009.
