= Beth Combs =

American basketball coach

Beth Combs (born September 3, 1969) is an American basketball coach.

== Career ==
Combs is the former women's basketball program head coach at Northwestern University from 2004 until her resignation on May 7, 2008. Combs compiled a 24–95 record in her four years at Northwestern, and a 7–59 mark in Big Ten conference play. In the 2004 season, Northwestern upset No. 22 Penn State 59–48, which followed the same achievement among ranked opponents more than six years previously.

From 2001 to 2004, she coached at Colgate University. She posted a 44–45 record through three seasons there. She went 21–10 during her final season there, and earned her second Patriot League coach of the year award. During that season, the Raiders made it to the NCAA tournament, before losing to national runner-up University of Tennessee.

She coached as an assistant at Eastern Illinois University prior to coaching at Colgate. She graduated from University of Illinois at Urbana–Champaign, where she was a practice player on the basketball team, and later from Eastern Illinois for graduate school.
