= Beth Harbison =

American author

Beth Harbison is an American author of women's fiction. As Elizabeth Harbison, she has written romance novels and cookbooks.

Harbison grew up in Potomac, Maryland. She attended the University of London, Birkbeck College, and received a bachelor's degree from the University of Maryland.

Her 2007 novel Shoe Addicts Anonymous was her first New York Times bestseller and it may be adapted into a film directed by Galgos Entertainment with Paul Weiland directing, and starring Halle Berry.

She currently has one son and one daughter, John Henry Harbison and Mary Paige Harbison.

== Bibliography ==
=== As Beth Harbison ===
- Shoe Addicts Anonymous, St. Martin's Griffin, 2007
- Secrets of a Shoe Addict, St. Martin's Griffin, 2008
- Hope in a Jar, St. Martin's Griffin, 2009
- Thin, Rich, Pretty, St. Martin's Griffin, 2010
- Always Something There to Remind Me, St. Martin's Press, 2011
- When in Doubt, Add Butter, St. Martin's Press, 2012
- Chose the Wrong Guy, Gave Him the Wrong Finger, St. Martin's Press, 2013
- Driving with the Top Down, St. Martin's Press, 2014
- Head Over Heels, Harlquin MIRA, 2014
- If I Could Turn Back Time, St. Martin's Press, 2015
- One Less Problem Without You, St. Martin's Press, 2016
- A Shoe Addict's Christmas, St. Martin's Press, 2016
- Every Time You Go Away, St. Martin's Press, 2018
- The Cookbook Club, William Morris, 2020

=== As Elizabeth Harbison ===
==== Romance Novels ====
- A Groom for Maggie, Silhouette, 1997
- Wife Without a Past (Fabulous Fathers), Silhouette, 1997
- True Love Ranch, Silhouette, 1998
- Two Brothers and a Bride, Silhouette, 1998
- Emma and the Earl (Cinderella Brides), Silhouette, 1999
- Plain Jane Marries the Boss, Silhouette, 1999
- Annie and the Prince (Cinderella Brides), Silhouette, 2000
- His Secret Heir (Cinderella Brides), Silhouette, 2001
- Pregnant Proposal, Silhouette, 2001
- Drive Me Wild, Silhouette, 2002
- Mission Creek Mother-to-Be, Silhouette, 2002
- Midnight Cravings, Silhouette, 2003
- Princess Takes a Holiday, Silhouette, 2003
- Diary of a Domestic Goddess, Silhouette, 2005
- How to Get Your Man, Silhouette, 2005
- The Secret Princess, Mills and Boon, 2005
- Taming of the Two, Silhouette, 2005
- A Dash of Romance, Silhouette, 2006
- Falling for the Boss, Silhouette, 2006
- If the Slipper Fits, Silhouette, 2006
- In Her Boss's Arms, Silhouette, 2007

==== Cookbooks ====
- A Taste for Love: A Romantic Cookbook for Two, 1996
- Loaves of Fun: A History of Bread with Activities and Recipes from Around the World, Chicago Review Press, 1999
- Bread Machine Baker, Gramercy Books, 2001
- Four Seasons with the Bread Machine Baker, Gramercy Books, 2001
