= Beth Todd =

American biomechanical engineer

Beth Ann Todd is an American engineering educator and biomechanical engineer who studies the mechanics of the human body and of assistive technology, and works to integrate graduate students in engineering into primary and secondary school mathematics and science education. She is an associate professor of mechanical engineering at the University of Alabama.

== Education and career ==
Todd is a 1981 graduate of Pennsylvania State University, and earned a master's degree in applied mechanics in 1986 and a Ph.D. in mechanical and aerospace engineering in 1992 from the University of Virginia. She joined the University of Alabama faculty in 1992, and became an associate professor there in 2001.

== Recognition ==
Todd was named a Fellow of the Society of Women Engineers (SWE) in 2004, "for her leadership, commitment to students, support of the achievement of women in engineering and passion for the engineering profession". She was named an ASME Fellow in 2011.

In 2008 the SWE gave Todd their Outstanding Faculty Advisor Award, and in 2013 they gave her their Distinguished Engineering Educator Award, "for a legacy of excellence in engineering education and for using scholarly research and involvement in professional societies to help students learn, compete, and achieve".

In 2006, Pennsylvania State University named her as a Centennial Fellow in the Department of Engineering Science and Mechanics.
