= Beth Denisch =

American composer

Beth Denisch (born Augusta, Georgia, Feb. 25, 1958) is an American composer. She received a Bachelor of Music degree from North Texas State University in Denton, Texas, and an MM and (in 1993) a DMA from Boston University, where her teachers in composition were John Harbison and Bernard Rands. She has taught at UMass Dartmouth and Northeastern University. She is currently Professor of Composition at the Berklee College of Music in Boston.

In 1996 she founded the New England chapter of the American Composers Forum, and she served as their director until 2005. She presently serves as Co-Chair of Gender Research in Music and Education International.

Denisch's music has had many prominent performances, and she has received notable prizes and commissions. For instance in 2002, the Handel and Haydn Society performed her "Sorrow and Tenderness" as part of a collaborative youth concert at Brockton High School in Massachusetts. Her "Fire Mountain Intermezzo" for string orchestra was performed by Chamber Orchestra Kremlin (directed by Misha Rachlevsky) in Moscow and New York City, after it was one of the winners of their Homage to Mozart competition. Writing in The New York Times, Bernard Holland noted the work's "fierce rhythmic patterns", and that while rooted in tonality, it "snarled and bit with dissonance."

Describing her "Golden Fanfare", for orchestra, American Record Guide praised its "drive" and "minimalist ostinatos and canonic fanfares on a Bulgarian folk-tune." In 1999, Denisch's "The Singing Tree" was a winner in the competition sponsored by the Pennsylvania Academy of the Fine Arts and Philadelphia Classical Symphony, for music inspired by the paintings of Maxfield Parrish. Following the performance of that work, the Philadelphia Classical Symphony commissioned Goblins' Night Out! for orchestra and narrator.

In 2003 the Equinox Chamber Players commissioned Denisch's Women, Power and the Journey and recorded it and Jordan and the Dog Woman. Denisch also lectures on music and gender issues, for instance at the Feminist Theory and Music Conference (X) held at the University of North Carolina at Greensboro, May 27–31, 2009. She is also active in the International Alliance for Women in Music.
