= Beth Wiseman =

Beth Wiseman may refer to:

- Beth Wiseman (composer), British composer, specializing in multimedia
- Beth Wiseman (author), American writer from Texas
