= Beth Dawson =

American biostatistician

Elizabeth Knight Dawson (also published as Dawson-Saunders) is a biostatistician and biostatistics textbook author.

== Education and career ==
Dawson completed a Ph.D. in educational psychology at the University of Illinois at Urbana–Champaign in 1977; her dissertation was The Sampling Distribution of The Canonical Redundancy Statistic. She worked as a professor in the Department of Medical Humanities of the Southern Illinois University School of Medicine, where she was granted tenure in 1981.

By 1990 she was working as a senior psychometrician in the National Board of Medical Examiners, and by 1992 she had moved again to the American Board of Internal Medicine. After returning to the Southern Illinois University School of Medicine, she was chair of the 2000 Research in Medical Education Conference, and chair of the Council of Sections of the American Statistical Association.

== Book ==
Dawson is the coauthor of the textbook Basic and Clinical Biostatistics (with Robert G. Trapp, Appleton & Lange, 1990).

== Recognition ==
Dawson was elected as a Fellow of the American Statistical Association in 1994.
