= Beth Hagendorf =

American actress

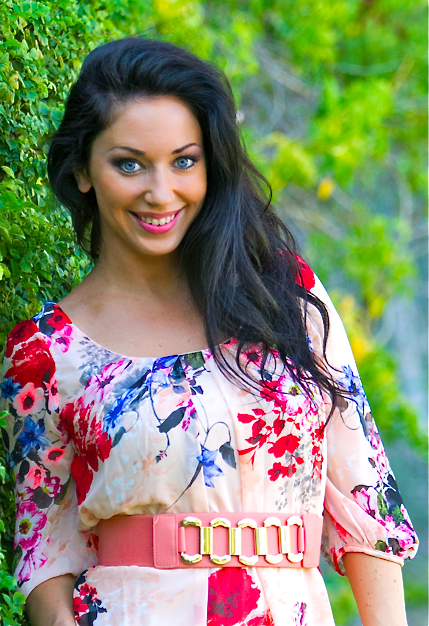
- Hagendorf at the Del Mar horse races 2013.
- Education: Texas A&M University
- Occupations: Actress, TV Producer
- Years active: 2012–present
- Height: 5 ft 4 in (1.63 m)
- Website: beth.tv

Beth Nicole Hagendorf is an American actress, television producer, and television host. She starred on Discovery Channel's TV series "Fire in the Hole." Hagendorf was the host for TV show "Drifting with The All Stars" on Velocity (TV channel). She is also known for her bikini contests in bodybuilding and her appearances in Flex Magazine.

== Early life ==
Beth Hagendorf was raised on a 6,000-acre cattle ranch, Tait Ranch, in Columbus, Texas. She grew up a sporty tomboy, riding 4-wheelers, and running wild on the ranch. Hagendorf's mother died at the age of 49 after battling cancer for seven brave years. Hagendorf graduated from Texas A&M University in 3 years with a Bachelor of Science in Sociology and minor in Psychology.

== Career ==
In 2011, she moved to La Jolla California and entered her first NPC contest. That year on New Year's Eve she was scouted by a model management company at a La Jolla restaurant and that began her modeling career. May 12, 2012, Hagendorf earned her Bikini Champion title in the INBA. In July 2012, Hagendorf won Flex Magazine bikini model search. In 2012, Hagendorf began her acting career when cast in a straight-to-video horror film, "Four Square," and was the TV show host of "The Talk of San Diego." In late 2013, she was cast to host the TV show "Drifting with The All Stars." Discovery Channel's TV series "Fire in the Hole" followed an explosives company, Hagendorf is affiliated with. She has now recreated an explosives television series in development.

== Filmography ==
Television
Year	Title	Role	Notes
2012	The Talk of San Diego	Show Host	
2014	Drifting with The All Stars	Show Host	13 Episodes
2015	Fire in the Hole	Herself	8 Episodes
2017	Therapists	Rhonda Jones	1 Episode

Film
Year	Title	Role	Notes
2013	Four Square	Laine	
2016	$elfie Shootout	Babe Nicole	

Commercials
Year	Title	Role	Notes
2014	FlyCheaper.com commercials	Flight attendant / spokesperson	Appeared in promotional commercials for FlyCheaper.com.

== Competition history ==
Bikini Class
Date	Contest	Place	Notes
12/03/2011	Excalibur - Los Angeles, CA	4th	NPC
02/11/2012	Muscle Classic - San Diego, CA	3rd	NPC
03/01/2012	Arnold Classic - Columbus, OH	11th	NPC - International
04/14/2012	Texas Shredder - Austin, TX	2nd	NPC
05/12/2012	Southern California Classic - San Diego, CA	1st	INBA
05/18/2012	Ms. Beachball - San Diego, CA	2nd	Non Fitness
08/10/2012	The Hot 100 - Las Vegas, NV	7th	Non Fitness
09/28/2012	Olympia Flex Bikini Model Search - Las Vegas, NV	7th	NPC
02/28/2013	Arnold Classic - Columbus, OH	-	NPC - International
03/09/2013	Muscle Contest - Los Angeles, CA	16th	NPC

== Political ==
Hagendorf associates herself with the Libertarian Party (United States).

== Personal life ==
Hagendorf is single; she currently lives in Pacific Palisades CA.
