= Beth Jones =

Welsh comedian

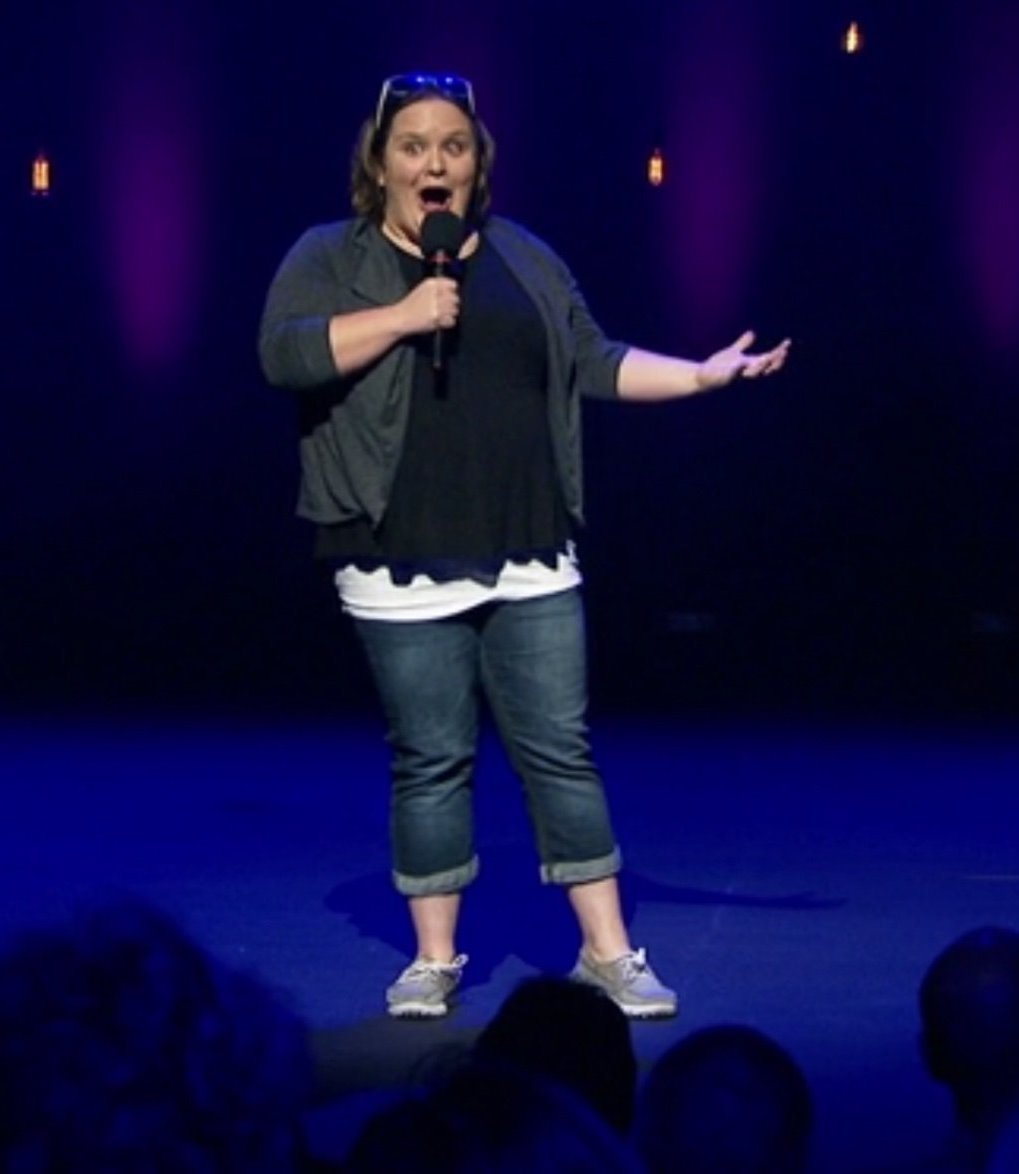
- Welsh Comedian Beth Jones
- Education: Ysgol Glan Clwyd
- Occupation: Comedian

Beth Jones is a Welsh comedian.

== Early life ==
Beth Jones is a stand-up comedian from Wales who performs in the Welsh language. She grew up in the Clwyd Valley and attended Ysgol Glan Clwyd, a Welsh medium secondary school, but now lives in Cardiff.

== Career ==
She has been on stage, radio and television since at least 2016 when she was one of the performers in the comedy production 'Gwerthu Allan' on S4C, the Welsh language television channel. One of her earliest gigs was at the cultural event Gŵyl Arall in Caernarfon in July 2016 with fellow Welsh speaking comedians Gary Slaymaker and Hywel Pitts.

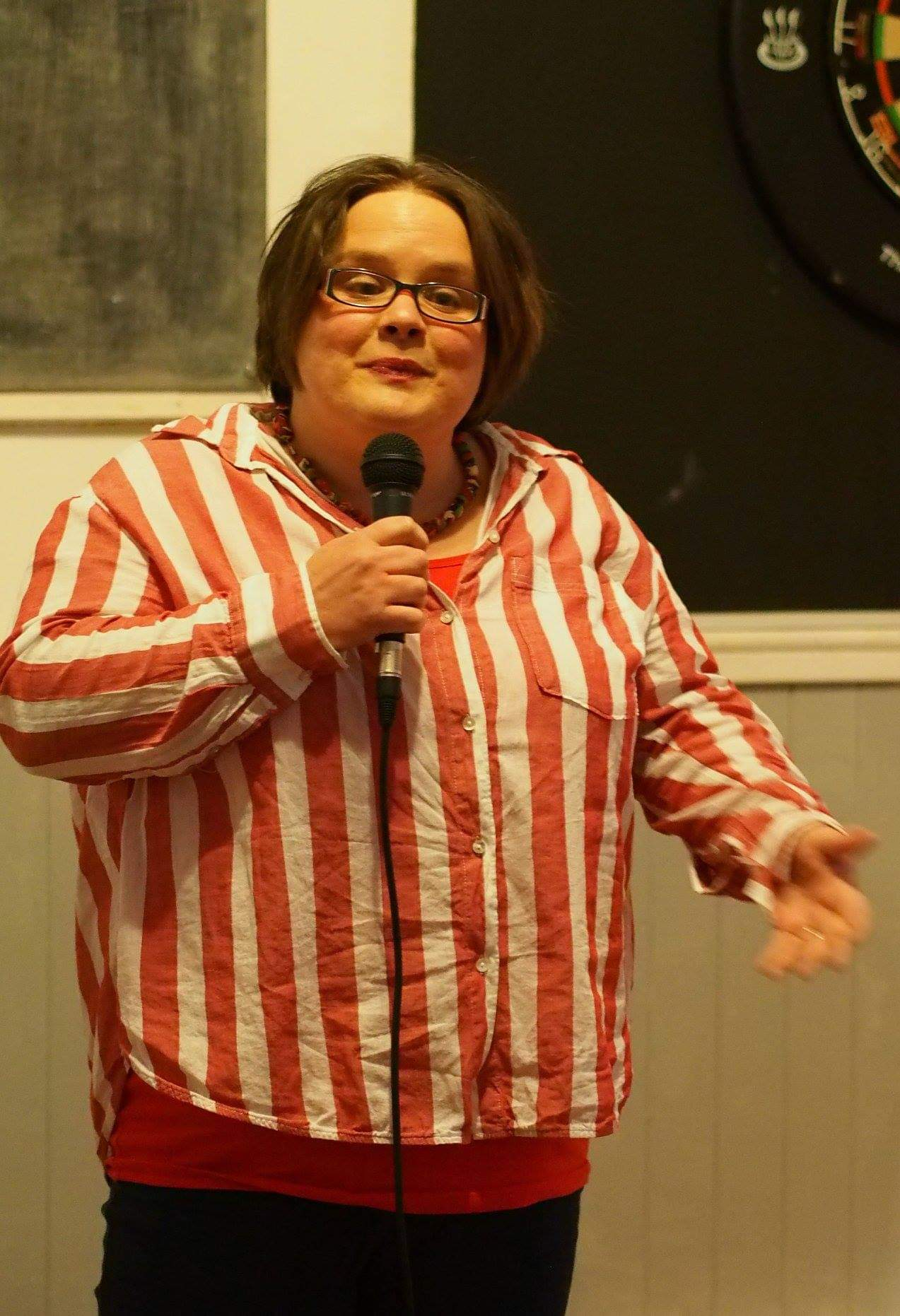
Beth Jones in performance

She has appeared in various shows and festivals including the Machynlleth Comedy Festival 2017 with other Welsh-speaking comedians, Josh Elton and Calum Stewart. At that festival she featured in an item about Welsh Comedy on BBC Radio 4 Extra with the prominent English comedian and presenter, Arthur Smith.

Beth has also done comedy sets as part of the Stand Up For Wales sessions organized by the Swansea group of the political campaign group Yes Cymru.
