= Beth Lo =

American artist, ceramist and educator

- Born: October 11, 1949 (age 76); Lafayette, Indiana
- Occupations: Professor of art, School of Art, University of Montana
- Known for: Ceramics and mixed media artwork

Beth Lo (born October 11, 1949) is an American artist, ceramist, and educator.

== Early life and education ==
Beth Lo was born in Lafayette, Indiana. Her parents were immigrants to the United States from China.

Lo received a Bachelor of General Studies from the University of Michigan in 1971, and then studied ceramics with Rudy Autio at the University of Montana, receiving her MFA in 1974. She assumed his job as professor of ceramics there when he retired in 1985, and was awarded the University of Montana Provost's Distinguished Lecturer Award in 2006 and 2010.

== Artistic style ==
Much of Lo's ceramic and mixed media artwork revolves around issues of family and her Asian ethnicity, culture and language. Lo uses calligraphy and references origami, mahjong and traditional Chinese pottery and figurines. The birth of her son in 1987 inspired her to comment on parenthood. Her 2009 work "The Good Children" includes images of stereotypical ‘good children'. These pieces are two-dimensional images on three-dimensional forms.

She has exhibited her work internationally, and was invited to make a new work for the Main Exhibition of the 7th Gyeonggi International Ceramics Biennale in Korea, 2013.

She has collaborated with her sister, author Ginnie Lo, on two children’s picture books, Auntie Yang’s Great Soybean Picnic (2012) and Mahjong All Day Long which won the 2005 Marion Vannett Ridgeway Award.

== Musical style ==
In addition to Lo's artistic life, she is a musician. Lo has been described as a "multi-talented person [who] is a superb bass player and vocalist". She is a member of several music ensembles, including Salsa Loca and the nationally recognized Big Sky Mudflaps, which has made appearances on the NBC Today Show and at New York's Kool Jazz Festival.

== Awards ==
Lo has received numerous honors, including the $50,000 United States Artists Hoi Fellowship in 2009, a $20,000 National Endowment for the Arts Visual Artist Fellowship Grant in 1994, a Montana Arts Council Individual Artist Fellowship in 1989 and an American Craft Museum Design Award in 1986. Her figurative sculpture and pottery has been acquired by Schein-Joseph International Museum of Ceramic Art at Alfred University, Harborview Medical Center, Seattle, WA, Microsoft Corporation, Cheney Cowles Museum of Art, the University of Washington Medical Center, Seattle, WA, the Permanent Collection, Yellowstone Art Center, Billings, MT, and the Hallmark Card Corporation Ceramics Collection.

- 2009 United States Artists $50,000 Hoi Fellowship
- 2008 UM School of Fine Arts Alumni Award, Odyssey of the Stars
- 2006 Montana Book Award Honor Book
- 2006 Marion Vannett Ridgeway Award for Mahjong All Day Long
- 2006 UM Provost's Distinguished Faculty Award
- 2003, 1993, 1991 Demonstrator, NCECA Conference
- 2002, 1996 UM School of Fine Arts Distinguished Faculty Award
- 1995 National Endowment for the Arts Public Projects Grant, "Native American Voices," Visiting Artist Program
- 1995 Presenter, NGO Conference on Women, Beijing, China
- 1994 National Endowment for the Arts $20,000 Visual Artists Fellowship Grant
- 1993 National Endowment for the Arts Public Projects Grant, "Artist As Activists: Social Responsibility in the Arts," Visiting Artist Program
- 1989 Montana Arts Council Individual Artist Fellowship
- 1986 American Craft Museum Design Award

== Selected one- and two-person exhibitions ==
- 2015 Pewabic Pottery, Detroit, MI
- 2012 Duane Reed Gallery, St. Louis, MO
- 2009 Carleton College, Minnesota
- 2008 Lane County Community College, Eugene, OR
- 2005 Missoula Museum of the Arts, Missoula, MT
- 2005, 2001 Francine Seders Gallery, Seattle, WA
- 2004 Santa Fe Clay Arts Center, Santa Fe, NM
- 2002, 2000 Lorinda Knight Gallery, Spokane, WA
- 2000 Mobilia Gallery, Cambridge, MA
- 1996, 1993 Mia Gallery, Seattle, WA
- 1996, 1993 J. Maddux Parker Gallery, Sacramento, CA
- 1990 Yellowstone Art Center, Billings, MT

== Selected recent group exhibitions ==
- 2014 American Pottery Festival, Northern Clay Center, Minneapolis, closing lecture
- 2013 7th International Gyeonggi Ceramics Biennale, Korea
- 2012 “The New Blue and White” Boston Museum of Fine Arts, MA
- 2012 “Contemporary Ceramics,” Stremmel Gallery, Reno, NV
- 2008 “Voices,” NCECA Invitational Exhibition, Society for Contemporary Craft, Pittsburgh, PA, (catalog)
- 2007 “Contemporary Ceramics at the Dairy Barn Arts Center, Athens, OH
- 2007 “Form and Imagination: Women Ceramic Sculptors” American Museum of Ceramic Art, Pomona
- 2006 “Life Insight” Kentucky Museum of Art and Craft, Louisville, KY
- 2006 “Clay Menagerie”, Garth Clark Gallery, NYC, NY
- 2005 NCECA Exhibition, Yingge Ceramics Museum, Taipei Taiwan
- 2004 “Portraits,” Society of Arts and Crafts, Boston, MA
- 2003 “Subject. Me. Object” Ferrin Gallery, Lenox, MA
- 2003 “Crossroads: New Art from the Northwest” Center on Contemporary Art, Seattle, WA

== Publications/reviews ==
- "Breath, Beth Lo in Korea". Ceramic Art and Perception. 97. 2014.
- Lo and Beth Lo, Ginnie (2012). Auntie Yang's Great Soybean Picnic. New York: Lee & Low Books.
- Lo and Beth Lo, Ginnie (2005). Mahjong All Day Long. New York: Walker & Co.
