= Beth Rogers =

Marketing academic

Beth Rogers (born 1957) is a sales consultant and author recognised as a thought leader on sales management in the UK. She continues to contribute to HE and the sales profession as a Visiting Fellow at Cranfield School of Management and as an Honorary Fellow of the Institute of Sales Professionals. Her 2020 book with sales development practitioner Dr Jeremy Noad, "Selling Professionally", was the IPS textbook for the UK L4 Sales Executive apprenticeship. This writing duo's "The Sales Professional's Handbook" is scheduled for publication in 2026. (https://www.linkedin.com/in/bethrogerssales/)

Rogers was Head of the Marketing and Sales academic community at the University of Portsmouth Business School (2012–2017). She pioneered professional selling and sales management curricula for postgraduates, undergraduates and work-based learners at University of Portsmouth Business School. Portsmouth was the first UK business school listed as a "Top Sales School" by the University Sales Education Foundation. Dr Rogers chaired the steering group which launched National Occupational Standards for sales in the UK (2005–2009), and was also a member of the Learning Advisory Group of the Chartered Institute of Marketing (2010–2016).

Her early career included business development roles in the IT industry, and consultancy. She was a consultant at Cranfield School of Management in the 1990s and co-authored research papers and books with Professor Malcolm McDonald on the subject of key account management.

She is one of very few sales management academic specialists in the UK. Best known for her work on key account management, her research at Portsmouth (2006–2013) focused on the outsourcing of sales activities (sales outsourcing). She is also known for publishing on a variety of topics with practitioners (see examples in publication list).

This textbook author also produces novels, short fiction and poetry under the pen-name B B Elsin (https://troubador.co.uk/author/b-b-elsin).

== Honours and positions ==
- Honorary Fellow of the Institute of Sales Professionals
- Member of the Academic Senate of the Chartered Institute of Marketing
- Chair of UK Sales Board (2005–2009)
- Honorary Fellow of the Sales Performance Association (since 2011)
- Co-chair Global Sales Science Institute conference 2014

== Publications ==
- Rogers B and Noad N (2026) "The Sales Professional's Handbook" MTP Publishing, UK
- Rogers B and Noad N (2020) "Selling professionally" ReThink Press, London
- Guesalaga, R., Gabrielsson, M., Rogers, B., Ryals, L., & Cuevas, J. M. (2018). Which resources and capabilities underpin strategic key account management?. Industrial marketing management, 75, 160–172.
- McDonald, M., & Rogers, B. (2017). Malcolm McDonald on Key Account Management. Kogan Page Publishers.
- Rogers, B., & Clark, L. (2016). CABS: a conceptual model for context-aware B2B sales applications. Journal of Research in Interactive Marketing.
- Rogers B (2011). "Business development" in "The marketing century" (Eds: Kouri J) the Centenary Handbook of the Chartered Institute of Marketing, John Wiley and Son, Chichester
- Rogers B (2007). “Rethinking sales management: a strategic guide for practitioners”, John Wiley and Son, Chichester
- McDonald M, Woodburn D and Rogers B (2000). “Key customers: How to manage them profitably”, Elsevier, Oxford
- Rogers B (2009) “An exploratory study of the make-or-buy decision in pharmaceutical sales”, Journal of Medical Marketing, Vol. 9, No 1.
- “The importance of retail atmospherics in B2B retailing: the case of BOC”, International Journal of Retail and Distribution, Vol 36, No 11/12 (2008), with Jeremy Noad
- “Integrating the value of salespeople and systems: adapting the benefits dependency network”, Journal of Database Marketing and Customer Strategy Management, Vol 15, No 4, (2009), with Professor Merlin Stone and Bryan Foss
