= Beth Pruitt =

American engineer

Academic background
- Education: S.B., mechanical engineering, 1991, Massachusetts Institute of Technology; M.S., Manufacturing Systems Engineering, PhD, 2002, Stanford University
- Thesis: Piezorestive cantilevers for characterizing thin-film gold electrical contacts (2002)

Beth L. Pruitt is an American engineer. (Note: Her research interests have been described as laying at "the intersection of mechanobiology, microfabrication, engineering and science") Upon completing her master's degree in manufacturing systems engineering from Stanford University, Pruitt served as an officer in the United States Navy. She is a full professor of mechanical engineering, biological engineering, and biomolecular science & engineering at the University of California, Santa Barbara. She is a fellow of both ASME and AIMBE.

== Early life and education ==
Pruitt completed her bachelor's degree in mechanical engineering from the Massachusetts Institute of Technology and received a master's degree in manufacturing systems engineering from Stanford University. Upon completing her master's degree, Pruitt served as an officer in the United States Navy before re-enrolling at the institution for her PhD.

== Career ==
Upon earning her PhD in 2002, Pruitt worked on nanostencils and polymer microelectromechanical systems with the Laboratory for Microsystems and Nanoengineering at the Swiss Federal Institute of Technology. Following this, she returned to Stanford University for the 2003–04 academic year as the Reid and Polly Anderson Faculty Scholar in the School of Engineering. In this role, she started the Stanford Microsystems Laboratory and was a recipient of the National Science Foundation CAREER Awards for her project "A Microsystems Approach to Cellular Manipulation and Interaction." In 2007, Pruitt was named the Principal investigator (PI) of a four-year project to learn how electrical, mechanical and chemical stimulation could be applied to stem cells to generate tissue for repairing damage. As a result of her research, Pruitt was promoted to the rank of associate professor of Mechanical Engineering on September 1, 2010. She was also the recipient of the 2010 Denice Denton Award from the Anita Borg Institute for Women and Technology.

While serving in her role as an associate professor, Pruitt oversaw a team in developing electromechanical devices for use as high-speed force probes. The following year, she was elected a Fellow of the American Society of Mechanical Engineers for "her work that includes a focus on creating micro-electrical systems to detect the minute forces that cells exert upon one another as they carry out the basic mechanics of life." She was also inducted into the American Institute for Medical and Biological Engineering "for outstanding contributions in microscale measurement technology for cell biomechanics and quantitative cell mechanobiology."

Pruitt was eventually promoted to the rank of Full Professor of Mechanical Engineering on April 1, 2017. She eventually left Stanford to become the CBE Director at the University of California, Santa Barbara. During the COVID-19 pandemic, Pruitt was elected a Fellow of the Biomedical Engineering Society as someone who had "demonstrated exceptional achievements and experience in the field of biomedical engineering."
