= Beth Stetson =

American economist

Beth Stetson is an American economist. She is an associate professor and currently the Charles C. and Virginia Ann Weddle Professor of Accounting at the University of Oklahoma.
