= Beth Levine =

Beth Levine may refer to:

- Beth Levine (fashion designer) (1914–2006), American fashion designer
- Beth Levine (physician) (1960–2020), medical doctor and researcher
