= Beth Keser =

American electronics engineer

Beth Keser is an American electronics engineer specializing in electronic packaging, and especially wafer-level packaging. She is head of Packaging & Systems Technology for Intel, and president of the International Microelectronics and Packaging Society.

== Education and career ==
Keser is originally from Rochester, New York; where many of her childhood friends were children of engineers. She focused on materials science as an undergraduate at Cornell University, graduating in 1993, and earned a Ph.D. in 1997 from the University of Illinois Urbana-Champaign.

After postdoctoral work in a research and development laboratory, she worked on advanced electronic packaging at Motorola for twelve years. In 2009, she became the leader of the Fan-Out and Fan-In Wafer Level Packaging Technology Development and NPI Group for Qualcomm, before moving to her present position at Intel. Dr. Keser left Intel in 2023 and is currently the VP of Manufacturing at Zero ASIC.

She was elected as president of the International Microelectronics and Packaging Society for the 2021–2023 term.

== Recognition ==
Keser is a Distinguished Lecturer for the IEEE Electronics Packaging Society for 2020–2024. She was named an IEEE Fellow, in the 2020 class of fellows, "for contributions to electronic packaging technologies". In 2021, she received the Exceptional Technical Achievement Award of the IEEE Electronics Packaging Society, with Tanja Braun, "for seminal contributions and leadership in Fan-out Wafer Level Packaging".

She was also one of five winners in a 2015 scriptwriting competition seeking pitches for a television show about a woman engineer, the only engineer to win.
