= Beth Kelly =

American political theorist

Beth Kelly is an American political theorist and feminist. Kelly is a professor of Women's and Gender Studies and Irish Studies at DePaul University. From 1997 to 2003, Kelly served as director of the department of Women's and Gender Studies at DePaul, and was a founder of DePaul's LGBT studies program. Since March 2010, Kelly has been chairperson of the Advisory Council on Lesbian, Gay, Bisexual and Transgender Issues, one of eight advisory councils to the Commission on Human Relations for the City of Chicago. Kelly received her PhD from Rutgers University.

== Writings and views ==
Kelly is openly lesbian. Regarding her academic career, Kelly says, "If someone had told me 30 years ago that in 2010 I would be tenured and promoted to a professor as a publicly professed Lesbian at the country's largest Catholic university, I would not have believed them. I love the university and I think I have given back a great deal of my time and effort as a result."

Among her research interests, Kelly lists feminist theory, LGBT politics, and queer theory.

In 2005, Kelly published the collective memoir Telling Our Lives: Conversations on Solidarity and Difference with Frida Kerner Furman and Linda Williamson Nelson.

== Political career and LGBT activism ==
In March 2010, Chicago Mayor Richard M. Daley named Kelly head of the city's LGBT advisory council for a three-year term. The council serves as a liaison for the gay community to the city government and is responsible for identifying areas of prejudice or discrimination impacting the gay community in relation to housing and human rights issues.

== Controversy ==
In 1979, Beth Kelly published an article and autobiographical account titled "On 'Woman/Girl Love'—Or, Lesbians Do 'Do It.'" Kelly recounted a sexual relationship she experienced, beginning when she was 8 years old, with a grandaunt who was at least 40–50 years older, and described her personal involvement in similar relationships both "as a girl and as a woman." The article, which presents a positive description of pederasty, has been reprinted by pro-pederasty organizations such as NAMBLA.

== Major publications ==
- "Three Lives: Conversations on Solidarity and Difference", with Frida Kerner Furman and Linda Williamson Nelson. Rowman and Littlefield, 2005
- "A House Made of Words: Class, Education, and Dissidence in Three Lives", John Freeman-Moir and Alan Scott, eds. "Yesterday's Dreams: International and Critical Perspectives on Education and Social Class", University of Canterbury Press, 2002
- "In Goldilocks' Footsteps: Exploring the Discursive Construction of Gay Masculinity in Bear Magazines," with Kate Kane, Eric Rofes and Sara Miles eds. "Opposite Sex: Lesbians and Gay Men Writing About Each Other's Sexuality", New York University Press, 1998
- "Grounds for Criticism: Coffee, Passion, and the Politics of Feminist Discourse", in Lois Lovelace Duke, "Women in Politics: Outsiders or Insiders?", rev. ed., Prentice-Hall, 1995 and 3rd ed., Prentice-Hall, 1998
- "Education, Democracy, and Public Knowledge", Westview Press, 1995 Recipient of Michael Harrington Award for Best Book published in 1995 from New Political Science Section of the American Political Science Association.
