= Beth Robertson Fiddes =

Scottish artist

Beth Robertson Fiddes is a contemporary Scottish artist.

Raised on Tiree and in Kingussie, Robertson Fiddes graduated from the Edinburgh College of Art in 1995 with a degree in sculpture. She won the 1997 Benno Schotz Award and second in the 2011 Jolomo Bank of Scotland Awards for her Scottish landscape painting. She is best known for her paintings of the West Highlands and Islands of Scotland, as well as her works featuring the south coast of Iceland. In 2018, Scottish Field magazine described Robertson Fiddes as, "one of the most exciting landscape artists working in Scotland today." In May 2026, Robertson Fiddes held a solo exhibition titled Northwest at Kilmorack Gallery near Beauly, bringing together her mountain paintings of Assynt and her marine paintings. Reviewing the exhibition in The Scotsman, columnist Roger Cox compared her approach to marine painting with that of Frederick Judd Waugh.
