= Beth McColl =

English non-fiction writer

- Born: Bethany Emma McColl; 19 June 1993 (age 33); Ashford, Kent, England
- Education: University of Exeter
- Years active: 2016–present

Bethany Emma McColl (born 19 June 1993) is an English columnist, author and podcaster. She has had columns in Dazed and Glamour UK and wrote the non-fiction books How to Come Alive Again (2019) and Romanticise Your Life (2024).

== Early life ==
McColl is from Kent. She graduated with a Bachelor of Arts (BA) in English literature from the University of Exeter in 2015.

== Career ==
McColl initially gained prominence through her social media presence, particularly on Twitter. In 2016, McColl joined the magazine Dazed as an advice and relationships columnist, which included agony aunt articles. She had a nickname Teddy or Teddy Bless. She also contributed articles to the likes of Vice, Square Mile, Elle and Metro.

In 2019 via Unbound Publishing, McColl published her debut self-help book How to Come Alive Again. She joined Glamour UK in 2020 as a monthly mental health columnist.

As of 2023, McColl hosts the weekly pop culture podcast Everything is Content with Ruchira Sharma and Oenone Forbat. Also announced in 2023, Orion Publishing Group secured the rights to publish McColl's sophomore non-fiction book Romanticise Your Life in 2024. The book "looks at the small ways we can bring more joy to our lives". She helped to organise a rooftop book club with Secret London as part promoting the book.

In 2026, HarperCollins acquired the rights to publish McColl's teen fiction series, starting with her debut novel Girl, Inexperienced in 2027.

== Personal life ==
McColl has dealt with depression and anxiety, as well as Tourette's and ADHD, the latter of which she was diagnosed with an adult.

== Bibliography ==
=== Novels ===
- Girl, Inexperienced (2027)

=== Non-fiction ===
- How to Come Alive Again (2019)
- Romanticise Your Life: How to Find Joy in the Everyday (2024)
