= Beth Gladen =

American biostatistician

Beth Charmaine Gladen is an American biostatistician who worked at the National Institute of Environmental Health Sciences, where she did pioneering research on children’s environmental health with physician Walter J. Rogan, including influential studies on the harmful effects of polychlorinated biphenyl as transmitted to children in utero and through breast milk, and on correlations between breastfeeding and infant mental development. The Rogan–Gladen estimator, a frequentist correction to observed prevalence rates to account for misclassifications based on sensitivity and specificity according to the formula
$$\operatorname{prevalence}=\frac{\text{observed prevalence}+\text{specificity}-1}{\text{sensitivity}+\text{specificity}-1},$$
is named in part for Gladen in theoretical work she published early in her career, again with Rogan.

Gladen completed her Ph.D. in statistics at Stanford University in 1977. Her dissertation, Inference from Stopped Bernoulli Trials, was supervised by Paul Switzer. She was elected as a Fellow of the American Statistical Association in 1999. She retired before 2007.
