= Beth Chapman (disambiguation) =

Beth Chapman (1967–2019) was an American bounty hunter and reality TV star.

Beth Chapman may also refer to:

- Beth Nielsen Chapman (born 1958), American singer and songwriter
  - Beth Nielsen Chapman (album), her eponymous second album from 1990
- Beth Chapman (politician) (born 1962), American politician, Secretary of State of Alabama
