= Beth Winkelstein =

American bioengineer and scholar

Beth A. Winkelstein
- Education: University of Pennsylvania (BS); Duke University (PhD)
- Scientific career
- Fields: Mechanisms of pain, treatments for pain and injuries, biomechanics, mechanotransduction
- Workplaces: University of Pennsylvania
- Thesis: [www.proquest.com/docview/304530642 A mechanical basis for whiplash injury: the cervical facet joint, spinal motion segment, and combined loading] (1999)

Beth Ann Winkelstein is an American bioengineer. Until May 2026, she was the provost and senior vice president for academic affairs at Northeastern University.

== Early life and education ==
Winkelstein received her B.S. in bioengineering from the University of Pennsylvania in 1993. She then obtained her Ph.D. in biomedical engineering from Duke University in 1999. After completing a postdoctoral fellowship at Dartmouth College, she joined the faculty at the University of Pennsylvania in 2002.

== Career ==
Winkelstein joined the University of Pennsylvania faculty in 2002 and received tenure and promotion to Associate Professor in 2007. She earned a promotion to Full Professor in 2011 and became the Bioengineering Graduate Group Chair. She was also chosen to edit "Orthopaedic Biomechanics." In 2006, Winkelstein was recognized by the American Society of Mechanical Engineers with the Y.C. Fung Young Investigator Award for her research in Bioengineering and demonstration of potential to make substantial contributions to the field of Bioengineering. By 2015, Winkelstein was appointed vice provost for education at UPenn and was elected to sit on the Biomedical Engineering Society Board of Directors.

Winkelstein has led a large multi-disciplinary research program that uses experimental biomechanical measures of fracture and injury to study problems of importance in head, neck, spine and TMJ injury. Winkelstein has been honored for her contributions to the scientific literature with an NIH Research Career Award in 2002, a Whitaker Foundation Young Investigator Research Award in 2003, an NSF Career Award in 2006, and the Van C. Mow Medal.

Winkelstein served as Co-Editor in Chief of the ASME Journal of Biomechanical Engineering from 2012-2021.

She was honored with election to Fellow of ASME in 2012, Fellow AIMBE in 2013, and Fellow BMES in 2014.

In 2018, Winkelstein was elected as a councilor to the World Council of Biomechanics, for which she has been a Session or Track Chair for World Congress of Biomechanics in 2022 and 2018. Later, she was appointed the Eduardo D. Glandt President's Distinguished Professor and Interim Provost. She served as Interim Provost from July 2021 through May 2023.

== Controversies ==
In 2022, a grievance signed by multiple university faculty members was submitted to the University of Pennsylvania alleging that Winkelstein violated university procedures with "arbitrary and capricious" conduct in defaming Mackenzie Fierceton, one of the university's own students.
