= Beth Katleman =

American artist

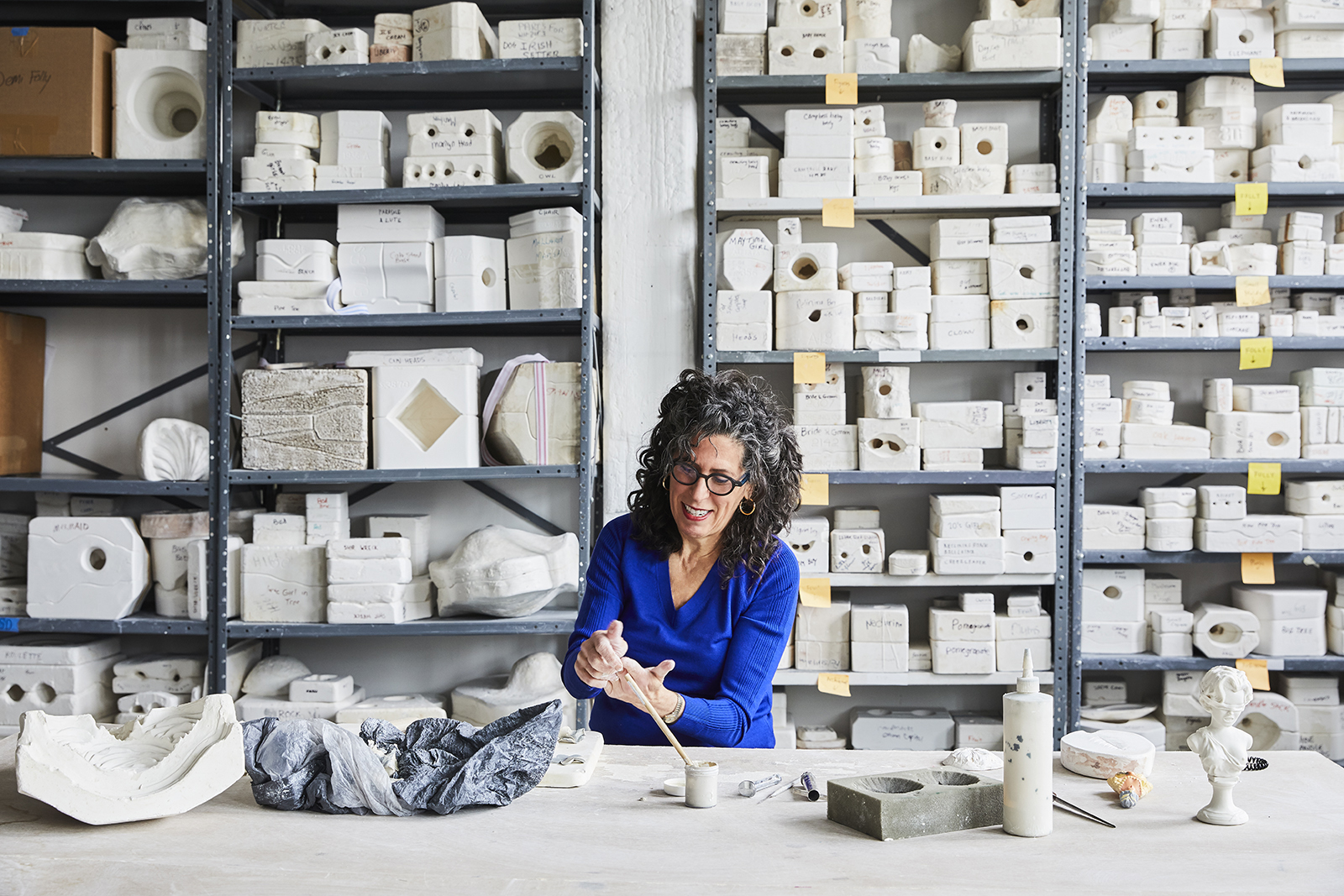
- Born: 1959 (age 66–67); Park Forest, Illinois, United States
- Known for: Sculpture
- Awards: Arts/Industry Fellowship, JM Kohler Arts Center (1995), Moët Hennessey Prize (2011)
- Website: bethkatleman.com

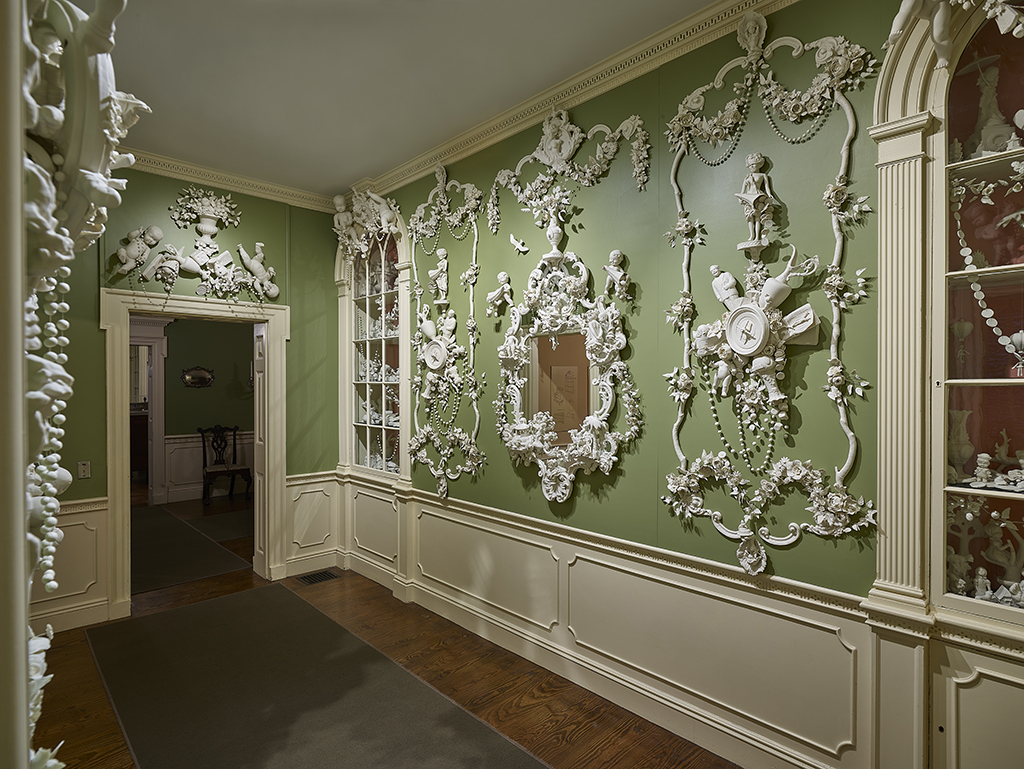
Raid the Icebox Now with Beth Katleman, Games of Chance 2019–2020, RISD Museum

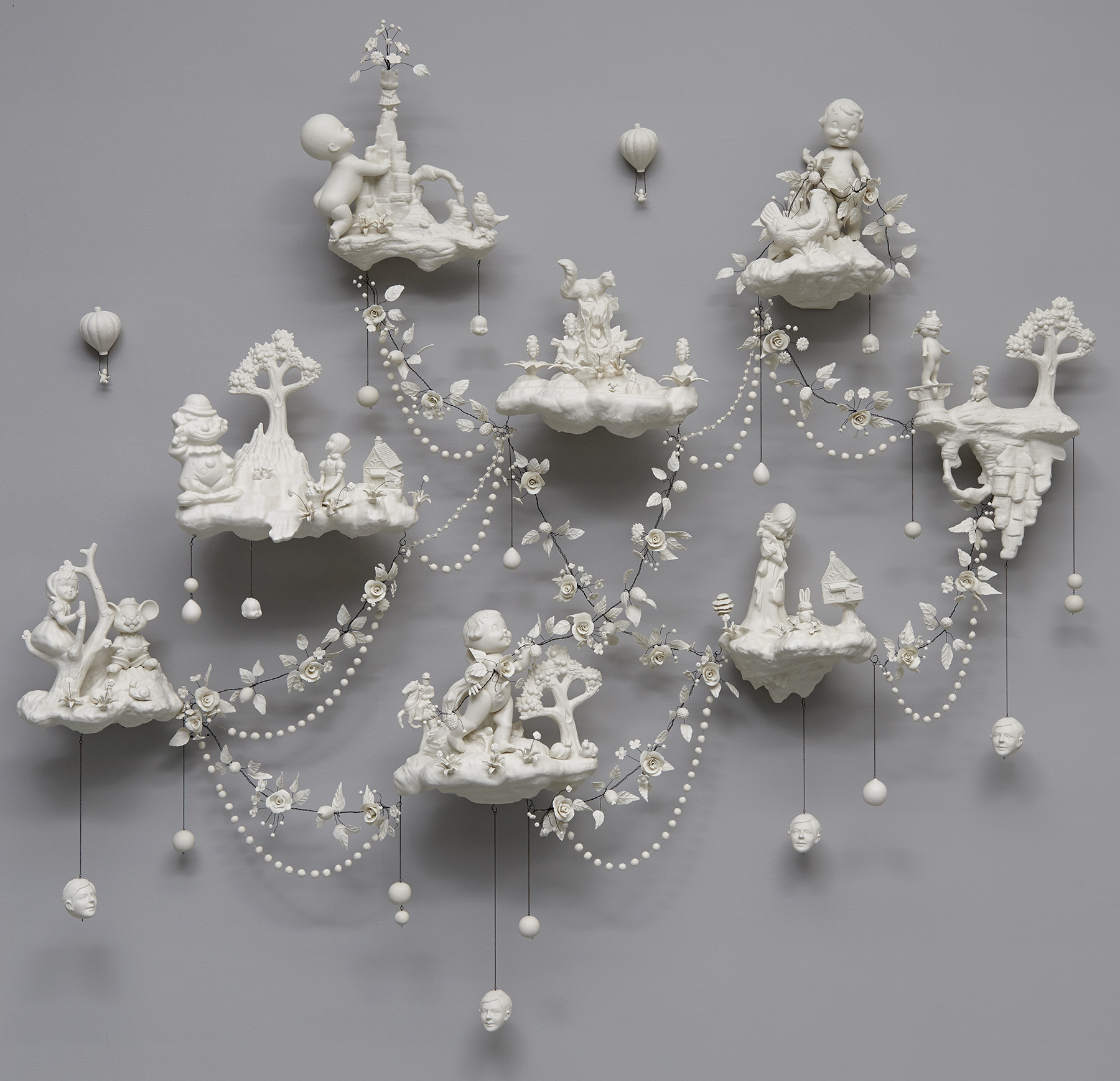
Arcadia, 2017

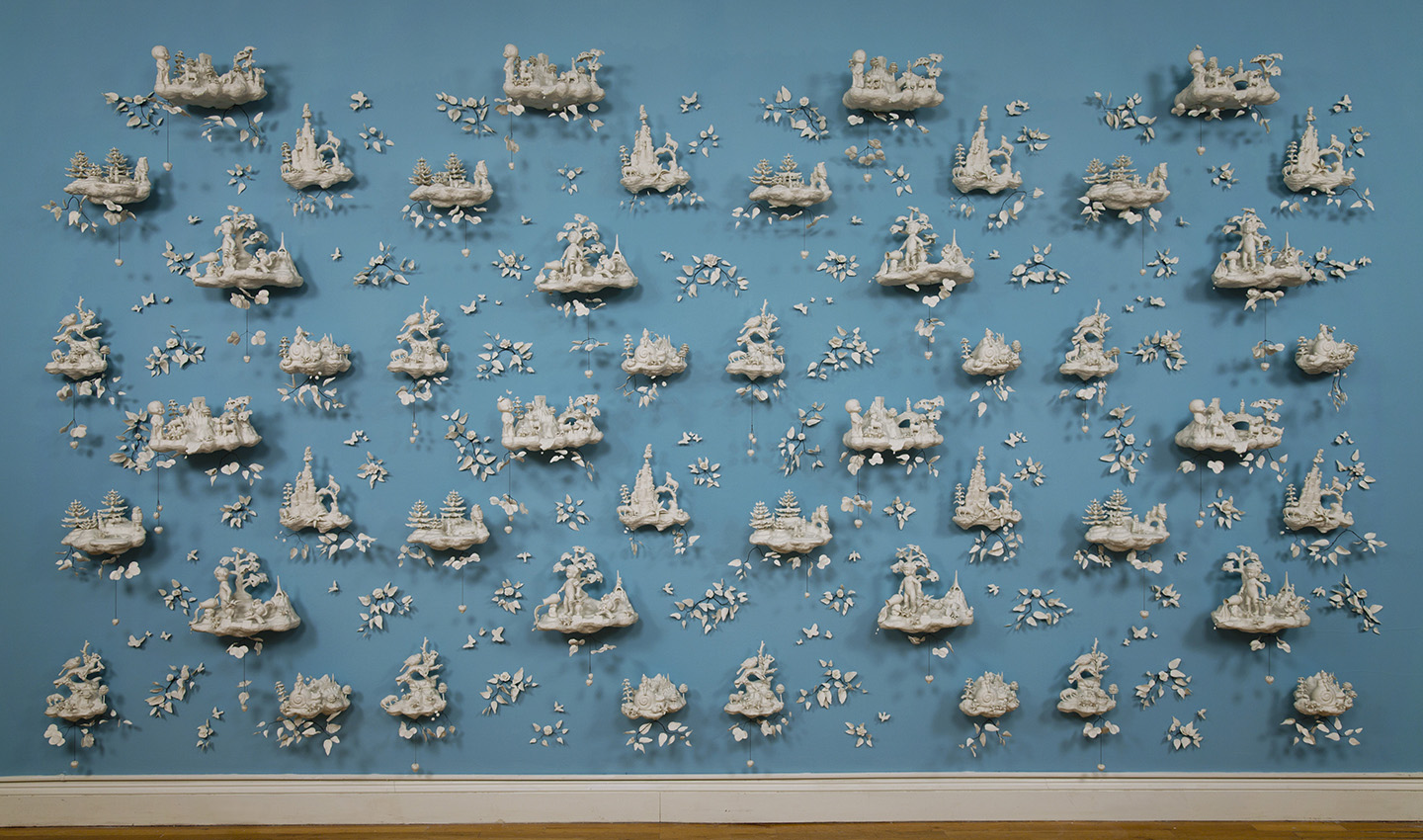
Folly

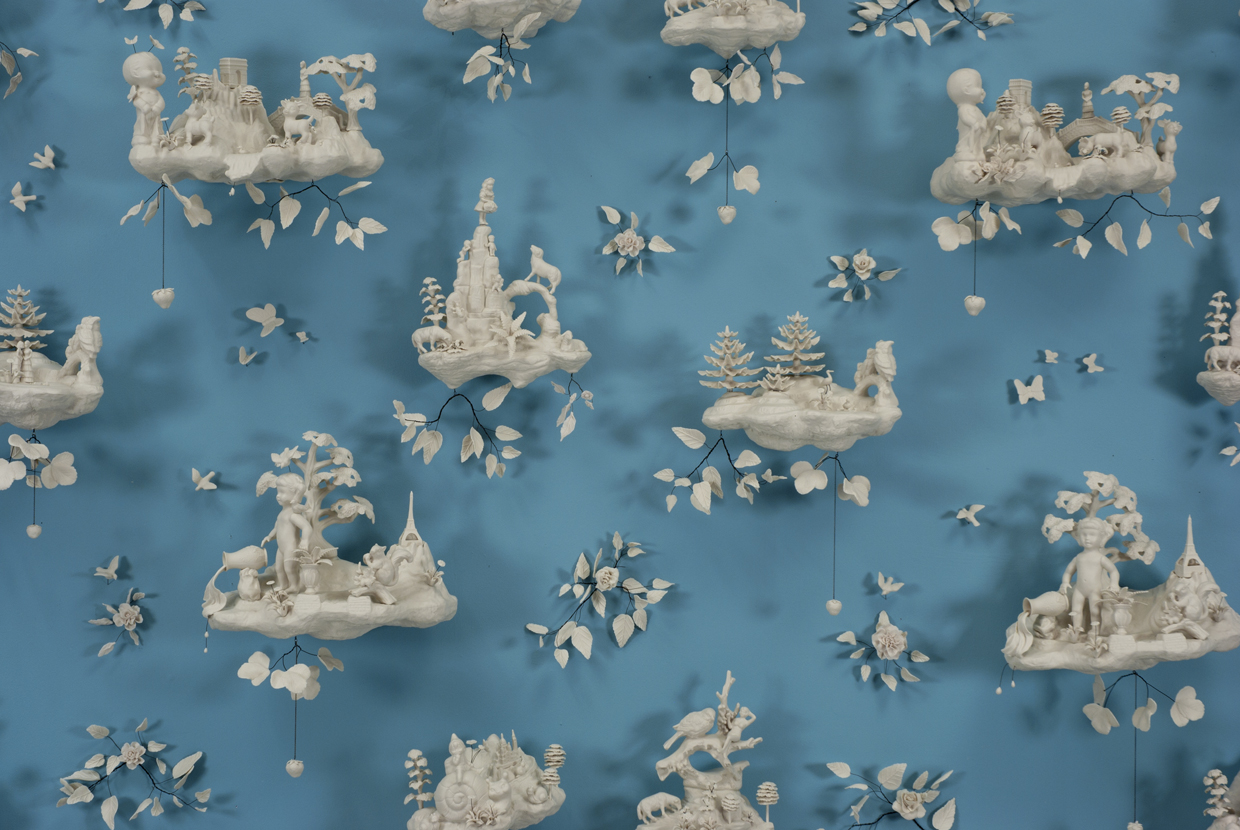
Folly, detail

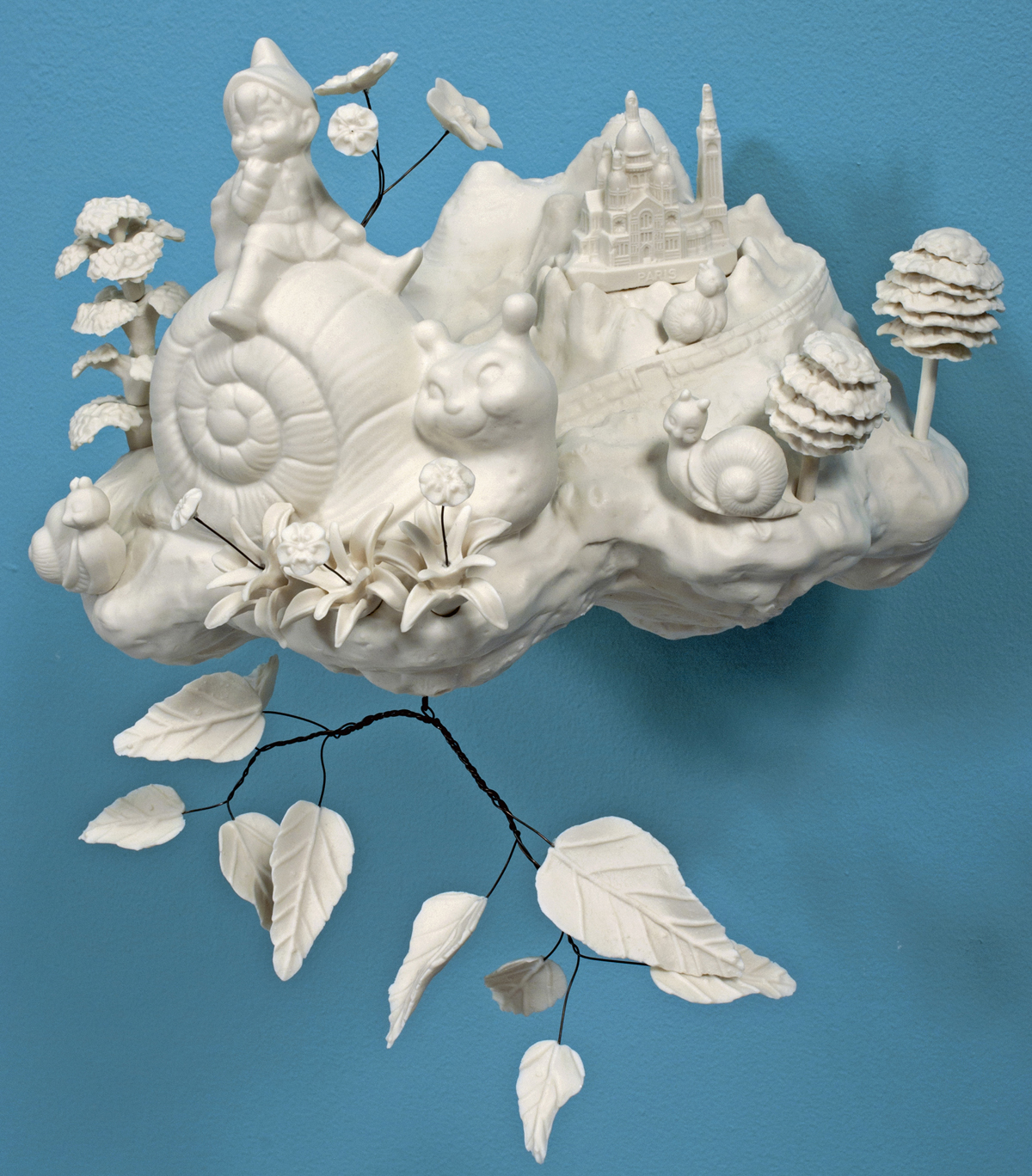
Folly, detail, elf, snail, Sacre Coeur

Beth Katleman (born 1959 in Park Forest, Illinois) is an American artist known for porcelain assemblage sculpture cast from found objects. Her allegorical installations fall within the genre of pop surrealism, combining decorative elements, such as Rococo embellishments and 19th century Toile de Jouy wallpaper scenery, with satirical references to consumer culture, fairy tales and classic literature. Katleman's work is in private and institutional collections and is exhibited internationally, including an installation commissioned by architect Peter Marino for Christian Dior, in the Hong Kong and London flagship boutiques. She lives and works in Brooklyn, New York, and is the recipient of the 2011 Moët Hennessey Prize, a Mid-Atlantic Arts Foundation grant, the Watershed Generation X Award, a Kohler Arts/Industry Fellowship and a residency in Cortona, Italy sponsored by the University of Georgia, Athens. Katleman holds a BA in English from Stanford University, an MFA from Cranbrook Academy of Art and an MBA in Arts Management from UCLA.

== Influences ==
Katleman's work addresses dualities between nature and culture; order and chaos; kitsch and fine art; dark humor and optimism; consumption and desire. Her sculpture is informed by parallels and differences between classic European decorative arts and American pop culture. The objects that she casts into sculpture are sourced from dime store trinkets, gadgets, dolls and toys. Katleman is influenced by porcelain rooms, such as The Royal Palace of Aranjuez in Spain; Toile de Jouy wallpaper found in Versailles and the Victoria and Albert Museum; and time studying Italian porcelain reliefs in the Salottino di Porcellana room at the Royal Palace of Capodimonte, Naples, which she visited during an artist residency at the American Academy in Rome.

Her early work incorporated bright colored glazes, gold details and overt references to pop art. Katleman's work has been included in group exhibitions intended to blur distinctions between fine art and design. In 1998 a work from the toilet series, produced during her Kohler Arts/Industry Fellowship, was included in Bathroom at the Thomas Healy Gallery, alongside Andy Warhol and John Waters. In 2019 the Rhode Island School of Design Museum invited Katleman to create a site-specific installation in response to the 1969 exhibition Raid the Icebox I with Andy Warhol.

In 2010 Katleman transitioned to working entirely in white porcelain, often installed as sculptural tableaus to produce a three-dimensional wall paper effect. Literature, in particular classical mythology and fairy tales, also inspires the work.

== Process ==
Katleman fabricates her sculptures using hand cast porcelain objects that are combined into a singular composition and kiln fired without a glaze to produce a matte white surface. A completed installation can contain up to 3,500 individual cast elements. The molds used to produce the castings are made after combinations of source materials are experimented with, using digital imaging software and hand drawn renderings. These 2D compositions are then used to visualize placement while working with figures from her studio library of objects.

== Exhibitions ==
- Raid the Icebox Now, RISD Museum, Providence, Rhode Island
- 2018- Strange Arcadia, Spagnuolo Art Gallery, Georgetown University, Washington D.C.
- 2017- Confabulations of Millennia, Institute of Contemporary Art, Portland, Maine
- 2016- Unconventional Clay, Nelson-Atkins Museum of Art, Kansas City, Missouri
- 2016- Contemporary Clay: A Survey of Contemporary American Ceramics, Western Carolina University Fine Arts Museum, Cullowee, North Carolina
- 2015- Tchotchke: Mass-Produced Sentimental Objects in Contemporary Art, The Gund Gallery, Gambier, Ohio
- 2011- Flora and Fauna: MAD about Nature, Museum of Art and Design, New York, New York
- 2011- Folly, Jane Hartsock Gallery, New York, New York
- 2011- Pavilion of Art and Design, New York, New York, London, England and Paris, France, Todd Merrill Studio Contemporary
- 2009- Selections from the Kohler Company Collection, 798 ArtZone, Beijing, China New Works/Old Story, Contemporary Jewish Museum, San Francisco, California
- 2008- The Diane and Sandy Besser Collection, M.H. de Young Museum, San Francisco, California
- 2000- Blown Away, Garth Clark Gallery, New York, New York
- 1998- Bathroom, Thomas Healy Gallery, New York, New York, curated by Wayne Koestenbaum
- 1996- The Pull of Beauty, Storefront for Art and Architecture, New York and the National Building Museum, Washington, D.C., curated by Kiki Smith and Victoria Milne
- 1994- Artists from the Archie Bray Foundation, Holter Museum of Art, Helena, Montana and University of Washington Art Gallery, Seattle, Washington

== Collections ==
- Nike, United States
- M. H. de Young Museum, San Francisco, California
- Christian Dior Boutique, London
- Christian Dior, Hong Kong
- Ci Kim Arario Gallery Collection, South Korea
- John Michael Kohler Arts Center, Sheboygan, Wisconsin
- Kohler Company Collection, Kohler, Wisconsin
- Archie Bray Foundation, Helena, Montana
- Right Management, Philadelphia, Pennsylvania
- Rhode Island School of Design Museum, Rhode Island
- Kamm Teapot Foundation, Sparta, North Carolina
