= Beth Long =

American politician (1948–2024)

Beth L. Long (April 7, 1948 – July 1, 2024) was an American Republican politician who served in the Missouri House of Representatives.

Born in Lebanon, Missouri, she attended Drury College. She was the first woman elected to county office in Laclede County, Missouri. She was elected in a special election in February 1990, was re-elected six times, and did not stand for re-election in 2002.

Long died on July 1, 2024, at the age of 76.
