= Beth Hayes =

American economist

Beth Hayes (May 27, 1955 – June 3, 1984) was an American economist specializing in theoretical microeconomics. She has been memorialized by an award established by the University of Pennsylvania.

== Educational background ==
Hayes graduated from the honors program at the University of Michigan in 1977 and received her Ph.D. in Economics in 1982 from the University of Pennsylvania, studying under David Cass. Her dissertation, Three Essays in Microeconomic Theory, formed the basis for her foundational work in research on two-part tariffs and asymmetrical information, and insurance contracts.

== Academic life and legacy ==
=== Hayes Asymmetric Information Model of Strike Behavior ===
Beth Hayes was a professor of managerial economics in the J.L. Kellogg Graduate School of Management at Northwestern University until her death in a traffic fatality in 1984. Hayes produced foundational research on two-part tariffs, the economics of information asymmetry, insurance contracts, and public regulation. The model of strike behavior has been referenced widely and empirically tested. "The Hayes asymmetric information model of strike activity predicts a negative relationship between actual firm profits and strike frequency, and a positive relationship between the trade union's expectations of firm profitability and the duration of strikes." Other references to the Hayes model appear in articles by Joseph S. Tracy, David Card, Other references to the model appear in studies examining trade union behavior in Papua New Guinea, and Japan. The model continues to be cited in studies on union strike behavior.

=== The Beth Hayes/David Cass Prize ===
In 1994, David Cass was instrumental in establishing the Beth Hayes Prize for Graduate Research Accomplishment at the University of Pennsylvania. The prize was created in honor and memory of Dr. Hayes, one of his former graduate students whom he describes in his essay "On Women." In its original form, the prize was awarded biennially to the woman in the economics graduate program who had produced the most significant piece of original research in the preceding two years. The award was later modified with Cass's approval to include eligibility for male students. Following his death, the university renamed the award as The Beth Hayes/David Cass Prize for Graduate Research Accomplishment in Economics.
