= Beth Williams =

Beth Williams may refer to:

- Beth Williams (model) (born 1987), model and Playboy Playmate
- Beth Ann Williams (born 1979), American lawyer
- Beth S. Williams (1951–2004), American wildlife veterinarian
- Beth Williams (EastEnders)
