= 1981 WBL All-Star Game =

Exhibition basketball game

East	West
92	125
	1	2	3	4	Total
East	29	15	17	31	92
West	35	26	34	30	125
- Date: February 9, 1981
- Venue: Civic Auditorium, Albuquerque
- Coaches: Greg Williams; Steve Kirk
- MVP: Nancy Lieberman
- Attendance: 3,378

The 1981 WBL All-Star Game was a basketball All-star game which was played on February 9, 1981, at the Albuquerque Civic Auditorium in Albuquerque, during the 1980–81 season of the Women's Professional Basketball League. It was the third and final WBL All-Star game as the league folded following the season. Four players played in all three games, Marie Kocurek, Molly Bolin, Althea Gwyn and Paula Mayo.

The West team was coached by Greg Williams of the Dallas Diamonds while the East was coached by Steve Kirk of the Nebraska Wranglers.

The East scored the first basket of the game, in what turned out to be their only time leading as the West dominated the rest of the game and won 125-92 in front of 3,378 spectators. Nancy Lieberman of the West team was named MVP after scoring 20 points while Molly Bolin led all scorers with 29 points. Carol Blazejowski, of the New Jersey Gems, and Inge Nissen, of the Chicago Hustle, led the east with 23 points each.

The game was sponsored by a group of Albuquerque business men, led by New Mexico coach Norm Ellenberger.

== Team rosters ==
=== East ===
Player, Team	MIN	FGM	FGA	FTM	FTA	REB	AST	STL	PF	PTS
Inge Nissen, CHI	-	8	20	7	8	7	0	-	4	23
Rosie Walker, NEB	-	5	10	3	6	3	0	-	5	13
Pearl Moore, SLS	-	5	16	1	1	2	3	-	4	11
Nessie Harris, MIN	-	3	8	3	6	2	0	-	2	9
Lydia Johnson, SLS	-	3	13	3	4	12	0	-	4	9
Angela Cotman, MIN	-	4	13	0	0	4	0	-	1	8
Paula Mayo, CHI	-	3	11	0	0	4	0	-	3	6
Holly Warlick, NEB	-	3	10	0	0	7	2	-	1	6
Linell Jones, SLS	-	2	6	1	4	4	3	-	3	5
Marie Kocurek, MIN	-	0	5	2	6	8	2	-	2	2
Totals	-	36	-	20	35	53	10	-	29	92

=== West ===
Player, Team	MIN	FGM	FGA	FTM	FTA	REB	AST	STL	PF	PTS
Molly Bolin, SFP	-	13	21	3	3	1	1	-	1	29
Nancy Lieberman, DAL	-	8	15	4	4	6	5	-	2	20
Carol Blazejowski, NJG	-	5	9	10	12	6	1	-	2	20
Cindy Haugejorde, SFP	-	7	10	0	0	7	0	-	2	14
Cindy Brogdon, NOP	-	5	14	3	3	6	1	-	3	13
Althea Gwyn, NEG	-	2	9	4	7	9	1	-	4	8
Gail Marquis, NJG	-	3	5	0	0	8	0	-	5	6
Cardie Hicks, SFP	-	3	11	0	0	1	1	-	5	6
Sybil Blalock, NOP	-	1	3	2	3	4	1	-	4	4
Rosalind Jennings, DAL	-	0	6	3	6	7	0	-	0	3
Janice Thomas, NJG	-	1	9	0	0	4	3	-	1	2
Totals	-	48	108	29	38	59	-	-	28	125

Boxscore
