= 1978–79 WBL season =

1st WBL season

- League: Women's Professional Basketball League
- Sport: Basketball
- Duration: December 9, 1978 – May 2, 1979
- Teams: 8

Draft
- Top draft pick: Ann Meyers
- Picked by: Houston Angels

Regular season
- Top seed: Houston Angels
- Season MVP: Rita Easterling (Chicago)
- Top scorer: Brenda Chapman (Milwaukee)

Playoffs

Finals
- Champions: Houston Angels
- Runners-up: Iowa Cornets

WBL seasons
- 1979–80 →

The 1978–79 WBL season was the 1st season of the Women's Professional Basketball League. The season ended with the Houston Angels winning the WBL Championship, beating the Iowa Cornets 3 games to 2 in the WBL Finals.

The league was divided into two divisions, with Chicago Hustle, Milwaukee Does, Iowa Cornets and Minnesota Fillies playing in the Western Division, while the Dayton Rockettes, Houston Angels, New Jersey Gems and New York Stars were in the East.

== Notable occurrences ==
- In June 1978, Karen Logan became the first player to sign a contract with the league.
- With the first overall pick in the 1978 WBL draft, Houston selected Ann Meyers from UCLA.
- The league's inaugural game was on December 9, 1978, between the Chicago Hustle and the Milwaukee Does at the Milwaukee Arena, attracting coverage in the previous night's CBS Evening News with Walter Cronkite. Milwaukee mayor Henry Maier issued a proclamation comparing this first game to the first professional football game, played in Latrobe, Pennsylvania, and the first pro baseball game, played in Cincinnati. The game attracted a crowd of 7,824, which saw the hometown team lose to Chicago 92–87. Debra Waddy Rossow of the Hustle, led all scorers with 30 points.
- The league was able to arrange an All-Star game in 1979, which was played at the Felt Forum in New York City's Madison Square Garden in front of 2,731 fans. The game was hastily arranged and inserted into the league's schedule, using a court borrowed from the United States Military Academy at West Point, and forcing some players to have to make hectic travel arrangements to get to their next regular season game. The East beat the Midwest by a score of 112–99. Althea Gwyn of the New York Stars led the East with 19 points and 16 rebounds, while Chicago Hustle players Debra Waddy Rossow with 26 points and Rita Easterling with 19 points led the Midwest. Easterling, who also had 18 assists, was named the game's most valuable player.
- The Houston Angels defeated the Iowa Cornets, 111–104, on May 2, 1979, behind 36 points by Paula Mayo, to take the league's first championship in game five of a best-of-five finals series.

== Standings ==
#	Eastern Division				
#	Team	W	L	PCT	GB
1	z-Houston Angels	26	8	.768	–
2	x-New York Stars	19	15	.559	7
3	Dayton Rockettes	12	22	.353	14
4	New Jersey Gems	9	25	.265	17

#	Western Division				
#	Team	W	L	PCT	GB
1	z-Chicago Hustle	21	13	.618	–
2	x-Iowa Cornets	21	13	.618	–
3	Minnesota Fillies	17	17	.500	4
4	Milwaukee Does	11	23	.324	10

Notes

- z – division champions
- x – clinched playoff spot

Semifinals
Houston Angels	2
New York Stars	0
Chicago Hustle	1
Iowa Cornets	2

Finals
Houston Angels	3
Iowa Cornets	2

== Statistics leaders ==
Category	Player	Team	Stat
Points per game	Brenda Chapman	Milwaukee Does	29.7
Rebounds per game	Althea Gwyn	New York Stars	17.3
Assists per game	Rita Easterling	Chicago Hustle	10.1
Steals per game	Liz Galloway	Chicago Hustle	4.00
Blocks per game	Sue Digitale	Chicago Hustle	1.12

== WBL awards ==
- Most Valuable Player: Rita Easterling, Chicago Hustle
- Coach of the Year: Don Knodel, Houston Angels
- Manager of the Year Chuck Shriver, Chicago Hustle

=== All-Pro team ===
- Rita Easterling (Chicago)
- Debra Waddy-Rossow (Chicago)
- Vonnie Tomich (Dayton)
- Paula Mayo (Houston)
- Belinda Candler (Houston)
- Molly Bolin (Iowa)
- Denise Sharps (Iowa)
- Doris Draving (Iowa)
- Brenda Chapman (Milwaukee)
- Marie Kocurek (Minnesota)
- Gail Tatterson (New Jersey)
- Althea Gwyn (New York)
