= 1979 WBL All-Star Game =

Exhibition basketball game

Midwest	East
99	112
	1	2	3	4	Total
Midwest	30	30	20	19	99
East	18	35	32	27	112
- Date: March 14, 1979
- Venue: Felt Forum, New York
- Coaches: Doug Bruno; Don Knoedel
- MVP: Rita Easterling
- Attendance: 2,731
- Network: WOR-TV

The 1979 WBL All-Star Game was a basketball All-star game which was played on March 14, 1979, at the Felt Forum in New York, during the 1978–79 WBL season.

The East team was coached by Don Knoedel of the Houston Angels while the Midwest was coached by Doug Bruno of the Chicago Hustle. Three players were selected from each of the eight teams in the league.

After falling behind 18–30 after the first quarter, the East team won the game, 112–99, behind Althea Gwyn's 19 points and 16 rebounds. Rita Easterling of the Midwest team was named MVP after scoring 19 points and handing out 18 assists. Midwest's Debra Waddy-Rossow finished with a game high 26 points.

This was the inaugural All-Star Game of the Women's Professional Basketball League, which was in its first season. Originally, no game was planned for the first year but Bill Byrne, the president and founder of the WBL, decided to organize it few weeks before. The game was broadcast on WOR-TV.

== Team rosters ==
=== Midwest ===
Player, Team	MIN	FGM	FGA	FTM	FTA	REB	AST	BLK	PF	PTS
Debra Waddy-Rossow, CHI	-	9	-	8	14	-	-	-	-	26
Rita Easterling, CHI	-	5	-	9	10	-	18	-	-	19
Marie Kocurek, MIN	-	7	-	3	8	-	-	-	-	17
Doris Draving, IOW	-	4	-	2	7	-	-	-	-	10
Gerry Booker, MIL	-	3	-	3	9	-	-	-	-	9
Janie Fincher, CHI	-	2	-	1	2	-	-	-	-	5
Donna Wilson, MIN	-	2	-	1	2	-	-	-	-	5
Brenda Chapman, MIL	-	2	-	0	0	-	-	-	-	4
Joanie Smith, MIL	-	1	-	0	0	-	-	-	-	2
Joan Uhl, IOW	-	1	-	0	0	-	-	-	-	2
Molly Bolin, IOW	-	0	-	0	0	-	-	-	-	0
Marquerite Keeley, MIN	-	0	-	0	0	-	-	-	-	0
Totals	-	36	-	27	52	58	-	-	-	99

=== East ===
Player, Team	MIN	FGM	FGA	FTM	FTA	REB	AST	BLK	PF	PTS
Althea Gwyn, NYS	-	8	-	3	8	16	-	-	-	19
Denise Craig, DAY	-	7	-	0	0	-	-	-	-	14
Paula Mayo, HOU	-	5	-	4	7	-	-	-	-	14
Vonnie Tomich, DAY	-	5	-	1	2	-	-	-	-	11
Gail Tatterson, NJG	-	5	-	0	3	-	-	-	-	10
Belinda Candler, HOU	-	4	-	1	3	-	-	-	-	9
Vivian Greene, DAY	-	4	-	0	0	-	-	-	-	8
Janice Thomas, NYS	-	3	-	2	2	-	-	-	-	8
Karen Aulenbacher, HOU	-	2	-	3	4	-	-	-	-	7
Wanda Szeremeta, NJG	-	1	-	4	5	-	-	-	-	6
Debbie Mason, NJG	-	0	-	3	4	-	-	-	-	3
Kaye Young, NYS	-	1	-	1	2	-	-	-	-	3
Totals	-	45	-	22	40	73	-	-	-	112

Boxscore
