= 1978 WBL draft =

Basketball player selection

General information
- Sport: Basketball
- Date: July 18, 1978
- Location: Essex House (New York City, New York)

Overview
- 80 total selections in 5 rounds
- League: WBL
- First selection: Ann Meyers (Houston); Rita Easterling (Chicago)

The 1978 WBL draft was the 1st annual draft of the Women's Professional Basketball League (WBL). The draft was held on July 18, 1978, at the Essex House in New York City, New York, before the 1978–79 season.

The draft consisted of a five-round college phase of 1978 seniors and a five-round draft of free agents.

== Draft selections and draftee career notes ==
Several players decided against signing with the WBL to keep their Olympics eligibility ahead of the 1980 Olympics. Ann Meyers from UCLA was selected first overall by the Houston Angels but decided against signing with the Angels to keep her amateur status. However, in the fall of 1979, Meyers signed a no-cut $50,000 training camp contract with the Indiana Pacers of the National Basketball Association. After being cut by the Pacers before the start of the regular season, she finally joined the WBL and signed with the New Jersey Gems. Carol Blazejowski also decided to keep her amateur status and did not join the league until the 1980–81 season, following the United States boycott of the 1980 Olympics.

Few of the selections where of the promotional aspect and never played a game in the WBL. The New York Stars selects CBS-Sports host Phyllis George with their last pick of the free agent draft. The Iowa Cornets selected 6'11" Gwen Bachman Hayes and the Chicago Hustle selected Sandy Allen, the world's tallest woman at 7'7".

The lone pick from outside the United States was Uljana Semjonova of the Soviet Union.

== Key ==
Pos.	G	F	C
Position	Guard	Forward	Center

^	Denotes player who has been inducted to the Women's Basketball Hall of Fame
^{+}	Denotes player who has been selected for at least one All-Star Game
^{x}	Denotes player who has been selected for at least one All-WBL Team
^{#}	Denotes player who has never appeared in an WBL regular season or playoff game

== College draft ==
=== Chicago Hustle ===
Round	Player	Pos.	Nationality	School/club team
1	Janie Fincher		United States	UNLV
2	JoAnn Burrell		United States	Boise State
3	Judy Toiberg		United States	Trinity-Illinois
5	Jane Trippet		United States	Cal State-Sacramento

=== Houston Angels ===
Round	Player	Pos.	Nationality	School/club team
1	Ann Meyers	G	United States	UCLA
2	Belinda Candler		United States	UNLV
3	Marie Kocurek	C	United States	Wayland Baptist
4	Patty Bubrig		United States	Nicholls State
5	Pat Johnson		United States	Stephen F. Austin

=== Iowa Cornets ===
Round	Player	Pos.	Nationality	School/club team
1	Charlotte Lewis	C	United States	Illinois State
2	Doris Draving	C	United States	East Stroudsburg
3	Monica Havelita		United States	Cal State-Long Beach
4	Debra Thomas		United States	Prairie View
5	Theresa Thompson		United States	Miami-Dade South

=== Milwaukee Does ===
Round	Player	Pos.	Nationality	School/club team
1	Sarah Williams	C	United States	Southeastern
2	Heidi Nestor		United States	UCLA
3	Linda Gehrke		United States	Colorado
4	Debbie Brock	PG	United States	Delta State
5	Cindy Lundberg		United States	Eastern Kentucky

=== Minnesota Fillies ===
Round	Player	Pos.	Nationality	School/club team
1	Ramona von Boeckman	G	United States	Delta State
2	Jackie Langley		United States	Tampa
3	Peggy Jackson		United States	Concordia College
4	Melody Neumeister		United States	Milligan
5	Deb Provost		United States	Eastern Montana

=== New Jersey Gems ===
Round	Player	Pos.	Nationality	School/club team
1	Carol Blazejowski	F	United States	Mountclair State
2	Denise Burdick		United States	Immmaculata
3	Tara Heiss	PG	United States	Maryland
4	Maggie Nelson		United States	Stanford
5	Wanda Szeremeta		United States	Montclair State

=== New York Stars ===
Round	Player	Pos.	Nationality	School/club team
1	Althea Gwyn	C	United States	Queens College
2	Marnie Dacko	C	United States	Southern Connecticut
3	Dawn Forster		United States	Cortland State
4	Susan Bretthauer		United States	St. Johns, New York
5	Lynda Lyman		United States	Cortland State

=== Dayton Rockettes ===
Round	Player	Pos.	Nationality	School/club team
1	June Brewer		United States	Ohio State
2	Tina Price	G/F	United States	University of Georgia
3	Donna Forester		United States	Clemson
4	Vivian Greene		United States	Norfolk State
5	Felicia Payne		United States	Dubuaue

== Free agent draft ==
=== Chicago Hustle ===
Round	Player	Pos.	Nationality	School/club team
1	Rita Easterling	G	United States	Mississippi
2	Janice Fuller		United States	UNLV
3	Liz Hannah		United States	Middle Tennessee
4	Sandy Allen	C	United States	N/A
5	Alice Townsend		United States	Mississippi College

=== Houston Angels ===
Round	Player	Pos.	Nationality	School/club team
1	Lusia Harris	C	United States	Delta State
2	Doris Felderhoff	C	United States	Stephen F. Austin
3	Gail Dobson		United States	Tennessee
4	Jessie Kenlaw		United States	Savannah State
5	Doris Horace		United States	Prairie View A&M

=== Iowa Cornets ===
Round	Player	Pos.	Nationality	School/club team
1	Gwen Bachman Haynes	C	United States	Oauchita Baptist
2	Anita Green		United States	Charleston, S.C. College
3	Paula Dean		United States	Berry College
4	Kathy Hawkins		United States	Nebraska
5	Uljana Semjonova	C	Soviet Union	TTT Riga

=== Milwaukee Does ===
Round	Player	Pos.	Nationality	School/club team
1	Patricia Roberts		United States	Tennessee
2	Sheila Sullivan		United States	Mississippi University
3	Pam Cook		United States	S.E. Louisiana State
4	Kathy DeBoer		United States	Michigan State
5	Cindy Henderson		United States	S.W. Missouri State

=== Minnesota Fillies ===
Round	Player	Pos.	Nationality	School/club team
1	Deborah Sherer		United States	Urbana
2	Pam Prowning		United States	Kentucky
3	Jane Westendorf		United States	Millikin
4	Joan Slagel		United States	Western Washington
5	Patti Decker		United States	St. Cloud State

=== New Jersey Gems ===
Round	Player	Pos.	Nationality	School/club team
1	Jean Giarussio		United States	New Hampshire
2	Elizabeth Harty		United States	C.W. Post
3	Tina Marie Krah		United States	Immaculata
4	Suzanne Wera		United States	Olivet-Michigan
5	Donna Kirby		United States	Drexel

=== New York Stars ===
Round	Player	Pos.	Nationality	School/club team
1	Harriet Novarr	F	United States	Queens College
2	Joanie Smith		United States	Arizona State (traded)
3	Pat Samuel		United States	CCNY
4	Debbie Mason		United States	Queens College
5	Phyllis George		United States	Denton-Texas

=== Dayton Rockettes ===
Round	Player	Pos.	Nationality	School/club team
1	Sheila Patterson		United States	University of the District of Columbia
2	Denise Craig		United States	Shaw
3	Linda Stoich		United States	Michigan State
4	Angela Scott		United States	Maryland
5	Sue Reyna		United States	Virginia
