= 1979 WBL draft =

Basketball player selection

General information
- Sport: Basketball
- Date(s): June, 1979
- Location: Hotel Roosevelt (New York City, New York)

Overview
- 143 total selections in 10 rounds
- League: WBL
- Teams: 14
- First selection: Pat Colasurdo Mayo (San Francisco Pioneers)

The 1979 WBL draft was the second annual draft of the Women's Professional Basketball League (WBL). The draft was held in June, 1979, at the Hotel Roosevelt in New York City, New York, before the 1979–80 season.

Unlike the previous year, the draft did not have a free agent draft but only a college phase of 1979 seniors. In total, 143 players were selected in ten rounds.

== Draft selections and draftee career notes ==
Pat Colasurdo Mayo from Montclair State University was selected first overall by the San Francisco Pioneers.

Cindy Brogdon, who was selected second by the California Dreams, was traded to the New Orleans Pride prior to the start of the season after she had decided to return to school. She joined the Pride for the 1980–81 WBL season where she averaged 14.7 points in 18 games and was named to the WBL All-Pro second team.

== Draft ==
Pos.	G	F	C
Position	Guard	Forward	Center

^	Denotes player who has been inducted to the Women's Basketball Hall of Fame
^{+}	Denotes player who has been selected for at least one All-Star Game
^{x}	Denotes player who has been selected for at least one All-WBL Team
^{#}	Denotes player who has never appeared in an WBL regular season or playoff game

Round	Pick	Player	Pos.	Nationality	Team	School/club team
1	1	Pat Colasurdo Mayo^{x}	F	United States	San Francisco Pioneers	Montclair State (Sr.)
1	2	Cindy Brogdon^{^}		United States	California Dreams	Tennessee (Sr.)
1	3	Alfreda Abernathy^{x}		United States	Dallas Diamonds	Alabama State (Sr.)
1	4	Katrina Anderson		United States	Philadelphia Fox	South Carolina (Sr.)
1	5	Bonnie Foley		United States	St. Louis Streak	Southern Illinois (Sr.)
1	6	Maclean Harris		United States	Washington Metros	Alabama State (Sr.)
1	7	Queen Brumfield		United States	New Orleans Pride	Southeast Louisiana State (Sr.)
1	8	Sharon Farrah^{x}		United States	New York Stars (from New Jersey)	Missouri (Sr.)
1	9	Carolyn Gamble		United States	Milwaukee Does	Shaw College (Sr.)
1	10	Katrina Owens		United States	Minnesota Fillies	Arkansas State (Sr.)
1	11	Pearl Moore^{^}		United States	New York Stars	Francis Marion College (Sr.)
1	12	Retha Swindell	G	United States	Chicago Hustle	Texas Austin (Sr.)
1	13	Mo Eckroth		United States	Iowa Cornets	Utah (Sr.)
1	14	Nancy Kuhl		United States	Houston Angels	Penn State (Sr.)
1	15	Kathy Miller		United States	Milwaukee Does	Weber State (Sr.)
2	16	Kim Hansen		United States	San Francisco Pioneers	Grand Valley State (Sr.)
2	21	Bertha Hardy^{x}		United States	Washington Metros	Jackson State (Sr.)
3	30	Anita Ortega^{x}		United States	San Francisco Pioneers	UCLA (Sr.)
