= Janie Fincher =

American basketball player

Personal information
- Born: April 22, 1953 (age 73) Duncan, Oklahoma, U.S.
- Listed height: 5 ft 7 in (1.70 m)

Career information
- College: UNLV (1977–1978)
- WBL draft: 1978: 1st round
- Drafted by: Chicago Hustle
- Position: Shooting guard

Career history

Playing
- 1978–1979: Chicago Hustle
- 1979: Washington Metros
- 1979–1981: Chicago Hustle

Coaching
- 1982–1983: Mississippi College (assistant)
- 1983–1985: Clarke College
- 1985–1994: Northeast Louisiana (assistant)

Career highlights
- As player: WBL All-Star (1979)

Career WBL statistics
- Points: 851 (10.5 ppg)
- Games: 81
- Stats at Basketball Reference

Janie Fincher (born April 22, 1953) is an American former basketball player. After playing college basketball for the UNLV Lady Rebels, she played professionally in the Women's Professional Basketball League, the first women's pro league in the United States.

== Playing career ==
=== College career ===
Fincher played college basketball for the UNLV Lady Rebels during the 1977–1978 season.

=== Professional career ===
In 1978, Fincher was drafted in the first round of the Women's Professional Basketball League by the Chicago Hustle. She averaged 16.6 points, 4.8 rebounds and 5.0 assists during her first season and was selected to the 1979 WBL All-Star Game.

She quickly became Chicago's most popular player and when head coach Doug Bruno did not start her in the opening game of the 1979–80 season, he had to change his home phone number due to angry calls from Fincher's fans. Shortly later, she was traded to the Washington Metros for two third-round draft picks and an undisclosed amount of cash. The trade turned out to be a very unpopular move with Chicago's fans, with many turning in their season tickets afterwards. Due to the uproar, the Hustle tried to get the trade voided but could not do so before the Metros folded with Fincher going into a dispersal draft with the other Metros players. Despite having a chance to select her with the 4th pick, the team traded the pick to the Iowa Cornets for Denise Sharps, and Fincher was then selected with the fifth pick by the St. Louis Streak. The Hustle however, then traded Adrian Mitchell to the Streak for "Future considerations" which turned out to be Fincher, and she returned to Chicago before the end of the month.

Fincher remained with the Hustle until the WBL folded following the 1980–81 season.

== Coaching career ==
Fincher served as an assistant coach at Mississippi College in 1982–1983 before being hired as the head coach of Clarke College in Newton, Mississippi. In 1985, she became an assistant coach at Northeast Louisiana University.
