= Alumni Hall (DePaul University) =

Multi-purpose arena in Chicago on DePaul's Lincoln Park campus

- Ray Meyer Court
- Interactive map of Alumni Hall
- Location: 1011 W Belden Ave; Chicago, Illinois 60604
- Coordinates: 41.923°N 87.654°W
- Owner: DePaul University
- Operator: DePaul University
- Capacity: 5,308 (basketball)

Construction
- Groundbreaking: October 3, 1955
- Opened: December 16, 1956
- Closed: February 26, 2000
- Demolished: Summer, 2000
- Cost: $2 million
- Architects: Naess & Murphy

Tenants
- DePaul Blue Demons (NCAA) (1956–2000); Chicago Hustle (WBL) (1978–1981)

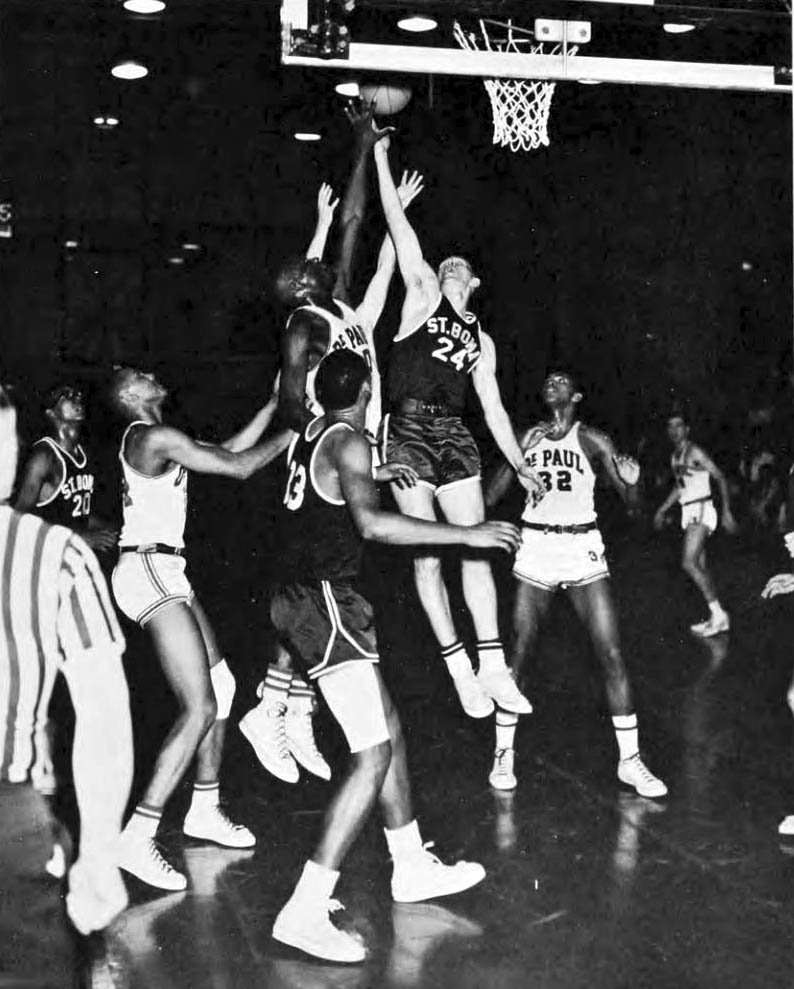
St. Bonaventure vs DePaul men's basketball, Alumni Hall, 1961

Alumni Hall was a 5,308-seat multi-purpose arena in Chicago on DePaul's Lincoln Park campus.

== History ==
Alumni Hall was dedicated on December 16, 1956, and was owned and operated by DePaul University. It replaced the University Auditorium, the school's prior on-campus gym.

A student-led fundraising campaign raised $25,000 over five weeks. This covered part of the building cost, which totaled $2 million. Construction began on Oct. 3 in 1955 and finished in December 1956.

The 44-year-old building consisted of classrooms, offices, an arena, a gymnasium with 5,200 seats, a swimming pool, locker rooms, handball courts and a cafeteria. Alumni Hall's value was equivalent to $18 million today.

It was home to the DePaul Blue Demons men's basketball team from 1956 until they moved to the Rosemont Horizon in 1980. The DePaul Blue Demons women's basketball team played all their home games at Alumni Hall from 1974 to 2000, while the men's team played occasional games there. The DePaul Blue Demons women's volleyball team also played their home matches at Alumni Hall.

The building was the site of the first round of the men's NCAA Midwest Regional in 1960 and was used for first round NCAA women's basketball tournament games in 1990 and 1992.

The arena closed in 2000 and was torn down in 2001. The women's team moved to the Sullivan Athletic Center and the men's team moved all games to their main arena, the Allstate Arena (formerly the Rosemont Horizon).

The land for Alumni Hall was repurposed for the new DePaul Student Center.

The arena has been succeeded by the Wintrust Arena. It was built in the fall of 2017 and holds 10,367 seats for DePaul's men's and women's basketball games. It is also home to the Chicago Sky of the WNBA.

== Professional basketball ==
Alumni Hall was the practice facility for the Chicago Bulls in the 1960s and 1970s. Alumni Hall was home to the Chicago Hustle of the WBL from 1978 to 1981.
