= Dayton Rockettes =

- League: WBL (1978–1979)
- Founded: 1978
- Dissolved: 1979
- Arena: Hara Arena
- Location: Dayton, Ohio
- Team colors: Kelly Green, Silver

The Dayton Rockettes was a women's professional basketball team located in Dayton, Ohio, United States. The team competed in the Women's Professional Basketball League, the first women's pro league in the United States, during the 1978-79 WBL season.

== History ==
The Rockettes made their debut on 15 December 1978, losing to the Houston Angels 90–82, with Vivian Greene scoring their first points. The team was originally owned by Louis Deitelbaum but was re-possessed by the league in February after he stopped paying the bills. Dayton’s final "home" game was moved to Market Square Arena in Indianapolis, on April 8, 1979, as a showcase for potential buyers. After no buyers materialised, the Rockettes folded after the season.

== Season-by-season record ==
Note: GP = Games played, W = Wins, L = Losses, W–L% = Winning percentage

Season	GP	W	L	W–L%	Finish	Playoffs
1978–79	34	12	22	.353	3rd, Eastern	DNQ

== Individual awards ==
WBL All-Pro team

- Vonnie Tomich – 1979

WBL All-Star

- Denise Craig – 1979
- Vonnie Tomich – 1979
- Vivian Greene – 1979

== Head coaches ==
- Linda Mann 1978
- Tom Griffey 1978–1979
