= Rita Easterling =

American basketball player

Personal information
- Born: July 26, 1955 (age 71)
- Listed height: 5 ft 6 in (1.68 m)

Career information
- High school: Morton (Morton, Mississippi)
- College: Mississippi College (1974–1977)
- WBL draft: 1978: 1st round
- Drafted by: Chicago Hustle

Career history

Playing
- 1978–1981: Chicago Hustle

Coaching
- 1977–1978: Mississippi College (assistant)
- 1981–1983: Mississippi College (assistant)
- 1983–1990: Mississippi College

Career highlights
- As player: WBL MVP (1979); WBL All-Star MVP (1979); 2× WBL All Pro (1979, 1980); WBL Assist leader (1979); Kodak All-American (1977); Mississippi Miss Basketball (1973)
- Stats at Basketball Reference
- Women's Basketball Hall of Fame
Medals
Women's Basketball
Representing the United States
Pan American Games
Gold medal – first place	1975 Mexico City	National team
World University Games
Silver medal – second place	1977 Sofia	National team

Rita Gail Easterling (born July 26, 1955) is an American former basketball player. Called the Queen of the Floor Burns, she played college basketball for Mississippi College where she was named Kodak All-American in 1977. She later played professionally for the Chicago Hustle in the Women's Professional Basketball League from 1978 to 1981 and was named the leagues MVP and All-Star MVP in 1979.

Prior to college, Easterling played basketball at Morton High School and in 1973 she was named Mississippi Miss Basketball.

In 2011, Easterling was inducted into the Mississippi Sports Hall of Fame. She was inducted into the Women's Basketball Hall of Fame in 2024.

== Coaching career ==
Easterling served as an assistant coach with the Mississippi College women's basketball team after graduation. Following her professional career, she returned to Mississippi, first as an assistant coach but took over as head coach in 1983.
