= Wilson High School (South Carolina) =

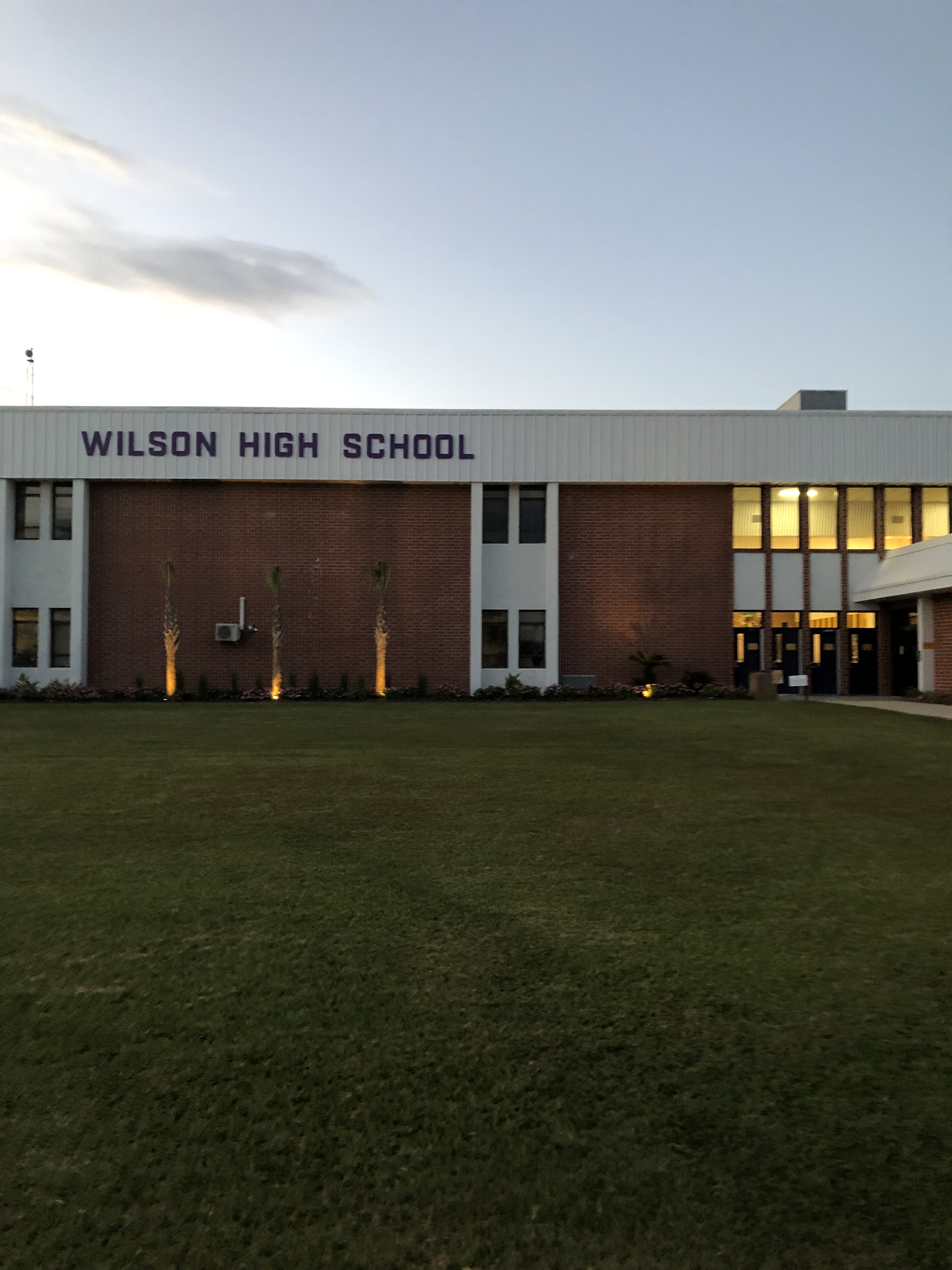

Location
- 1411 Old Marion Highway; Florence, South Carolina 29506; United States; 34.2198772°N 79.7308945°W

Information
- School type: Public
- Founded: 1866 (160 years ago)
- Principal: Eric Robinson
- Teaching staff: 88.50 (on an FTE basis)
- Enrollment: 1,316 (2023–2024)
- Student to teacher ratio: 14.87
- Colors: Royal purple and gold
- Mascot: Tiger
- Newspaper: The Purple and Gold
- Website: www.f1s.org/wilson

Wilson High School is one of three high schools in Florence Public School District One in Florence, South Carolina, United States. It is the only high school in Florence County that offers the International Baccalaureate diploma.

== History ==
Wilson School was Florence's first public school. It was opened in 1866 by the Freedmen’s Bureau as a private school for Black children, and became a public school when South Carolina’s system of free public schools was established in 1868. An early principal of what was then known as the Colored Graded School was the Methodist minister Joshua E. Wilson, and the current school is likely named for him. In 1906 the wooden-frame building was demolished, and a new Wilson High School was built on Athens Street, away from downtown in a black residential neighborhood. The school moved to North Irby Street in 1956 and to its current location on Old Marion Highway in 1982.

== Academics ==
Wilson's We the People: The Citizen and the Constitution debate team won the annual state competition in 2001, 2003, 2004, 2005, and 2010.

Wilson has won the Pee Dee Regional Academic Challenge AAA/AAAA championship eleven out of the past twelve years, and won the 2010 State Championship.

Wilson has the only Florence chapter of the International Baccalaureate Diploma Programme (IBDP).

== Athletics ==
Wilson competes in the AAAA classification of the South Carolina High School League and is located in Lower State, Region VI with Myrtle Beach High School, North Myrtle Beach High School, Hartsville High school, West Florence High School, and South Florence High School.

In 2002, the varsity baseball team won the AAA state championship. The boys' basketball and varsity football teams won AAA state championships in 2007.

The boys' basketball team won AAAA state championship in 2022.

== Notable alumni ==
- Harry Carson, (1972), Hall of Fame football player, NY Giants
- Darian Durant (2000), football player, Saskatchewan Roughriders
- Justin Durant (2003), football player, Atlanta Falcons
- Maggie Glover (1968), first black female Senator to serve in state senate
- Clayton Holmes, retired football player, Dallas Cowboys
- William Johnson (attended 1916–1918), painter
- Jolette Law (1986), basketball assistant coach South Carolina Lady Gamecocks, former Illinois Fighting Illini head coach and Harlem Globetrotter from 1991 to 1994
- Trey Lorenz (1987), singer and songwriter
- Pearl Moore (1975), basketball player
- Carlos Powell (2001), basketball player, NIT MVP and Dakota Wizards forward
- Reggie Sanders (1985), retired baseball player, Kansas City Royals
- Lawrence Timmons (2004), professional football player, Pittsburgh Steelers, Miami Dolphins
