= Pearl Moore =

American basketball player (born 1957)

Personal information
- Born: March 16, 1957 (age 69)

Career information
- High school: Wilson (Florence, South Carolina)
- College: Anderson Junior College (1975); Francis Marion (1975-1979)
- WBL draft: 1979: 1st round, 11th overall pick
- Drafted by: New York Stars
- Position: Point guard

Career history
- 1979-1980: New York Stars
- 1980-1981: St. Louis Streak

Career highlights
- WBL champion (1980); WBL All-Star (1981)
- Stats at Basketball Reference
- Basketball Hall of Fame
- Women's Basketball Hall of Fame

Pearl Moore (born March 16, 1957) is an American former basketball player. During her collegiate career at Francis Marion University, Moore established herself as one of the most prolific scorers in college history, male or female, and is the all-time career-scoring leader in women's college basketball. She later played professionally in the Women's Professional Basketball League with the New York Stars and the St. Louis Streak.

== Early life ==
Born in Florence, South Carolina, Moore began playing basketball while attending Wilson High School where she was in the starting line-up for all four years, and achieved early success, earning the MVP award at the 1975 and 1976 AAU Junior Olympic Games.

== College career ==
Moore, who commenced her collegiate career with Anderson Junior College for one semester (where she amassed 177 points in eight games), transferred to Francis Marion University, and, because of AIAW rules, she was immediately eligible to play the remainder of the 1975–76 season for the campus's team, the Patriots. Patriots head coach Sylvia Hatchell reflected on Moore's unique ability to score: "She was outside, inside, she could handle the ball, draw fouls. I saw her wait for the defense to catch up with her so she could draw the foul and make a 3-point play. She was ahead of her time".

During her junior year, Moore posted a then single-game record 60 points in a victory over Eastern Washington State College in the 1978 AIAW Small College National Tournament. On March 10, 1979, in her final collegiate game, Moore scored 42 points against the University of Tennessee at Chattanooga to finish her collegiate career at Francis Marion with 3,884 points, which was the all-time women’s collegiate scoring record (as set forth in the AIAW record book maintained by the NCAA) at the time. It was later beaten by Caitlin Clark; Clark finished playing in college with 3,951 points. Overall, Moore averaged 30.6 points per game during her time at Francis Marion, an era where the three-point arc was not incorporated into women's basketball. Moore also helped lead the Patriots to three national championship appearances. Throughout her career with Francis Marion, Moore always scored in double figures, and posted fewer than 20 points in only 18 of her total 128 games, which both testify to her dominance offensively. With the AIAW having dissolved in 1982, it remains the most points scored by any AIAW basketball player,

Moore is sometimes credited with scoring 4,061 points in college, but that includes 177 points scored during her single semester at Anderson Junior College. Because junior college statistics are not included in either NCAA or AIAW scoring records, Moore’s AIAW collegiate scoring total is recognized as 3,884. That is the AIAW scoring record, ahead of Lynette Woodard’s AIAW total of 3,649. The current record for points scored against four-year schools is 3,961, by Grace Beyer of NAIA member UHSP from 2019 to 2024. (Note: Both the NCAA and NAIA ruled that the 2020–21 season, the season most seriously disrupted by the public response to COVID-19, would not count against the athletic eligibility of any basketball player.) Beyer finished her college career 10 points ahead of Clark.

== Professional career ==
Moore graduated from Francis Marion in 1979 with a Bachelor of Science degree in sociology. She was subsequently selected in the first round by the New York Stars in the Women's Professional Basketball League draft. In her first professional season, the Stars concluded their regular schedule with the highest winning-percentage in the league. Despite a 36-point game from "Machine Gun" Molly Bolin of the Iowa Cornets, the Stars won the championship series behind a 27-point effort by Moore. She played another season, joining the St. Louis Streak, and participated in the 1981 WBL All-Star Game. When the WBL folded, Moore played the final season of her professional career in Venezuela.

== Later life ==
Following her pro career, Moore coached high-school teams. She has received recognition for her accomplishments in women's basketball with her induction into the FMU Athletic Hall of Fame in 1992 and the Women's Basketball Hall of Fame in 2011. Michael Hawkins, who nominated Moore for the latter honor, called her one of college basketball's most prolific scorers and the best player Francis Marion ever produced. Moore currently hosts her own girls' basketball camp.

In May 2021, Moore was selected to be inducted into the Naismith Memorial Basketball Hall of Fame in its 2021 class.
