= Gail Marquis =

American former basketball player (born 1954)

Personal information
- Born: November 18, 1954 (age 71) New York City, New York
- Listed height: 6 ft 0 in (1.83 m)
- Stats at Basketball Reference
Medals
Women's basketball
Representing the United States
Olympic Games
Silver medal – second place	1976 Montreal	Team competition
World University Games
Silver medal – second place	1977 Sofia	Team competition

Gail Annette Marquis (born November 18, 1954, in New York City, New York) is an American former basketball player who competed in the 1976 Summer Olympics.

== Basketball career ==
Marquis played women's collegiate basketball at Queens College, City University of New York, where she was a two-time All-American. On February 22, 1975, she played for Queens College in the first women's basketball game held at Madison Square Garden. The Queens College team was coached by Lucille Kyvallos. Among Marquis's teammates was Donna Orender, who later served as president of the Women's National Basketball Association. Queens College lost the game to Immaculata College, coached by Cathy Rush.

Marquis was named to the USA Basketball National Team to represent the US at the 1976 Olympics, the first year that women's basketball would be played at the Olympics. The USA team ended with a record of 3–2, losing to the eventual gold medal champion USSR in the semifinal game, and winning the final game against Czechoslovakia to take home the silver medal.

Marquis remained on the National team in the subsequent year as the team competed in the 1977 World University Games. After winning the opening game against Germany, Marquis had a double-double with 17 points and 11 rebounds to help the USA team defeat Mexico. Marquis scored 16 points in a close game against Romania, which USA team won 76–73. The USSR team was too strong for the USA team, winning twice against the USA team, including the gold medal game. The USA team captured the silver medal. Marquis was the third leading scorer on the team, averaging 12.0 points per game and the second leading rebounder, with 7.0 per game.

Marquis played for the French Federation of Basketball and in the U.S. for the New York Stars and later the New Jersey Gems of the Women's Basketball League (W.B.L). She was on the Stars when they won a championship in 1980.

In 2009, Marquis became first woman of color inducted into the New York City Basketball Hall of Fame.

== After basketball ==
Following her basketball career, Gail Marquis went on to become a Wall Street executive. Though she didn't have a business degree, she became certified as a stock broker by passing the high-level Series 7 Registered Representative exam. During her time on Wall Street, she worked for some of Wall Street's largest investment firms. This included Dean Witter Reynolds, PaineWebber, UBS, Merrill Lynch, and JPMorgan Chase.

Marquis is known as an advocate for women who gives back to the community. She has worked with the organizations Dress for Success and PowerPlay NYC, and served as a representative at the United Nations 57th Commission on the Status of Women in 2013.

Her life story is chronicled in a 2016 University of Phoenix commercial.

== Personal life ==
Marquis grew up in Queens, New York. One of her first jobs was as a vendor at Shea Stadium. In 2011, Marquis married Audrey Smaltz.
