= Kaye Young =

American basketball player

Personal information
- Born: April 17, 1956; Bunn, North Carolina, U.S.
- Died: July 23, 2010 (aged 54); North Carolina, U.S.
- Listed height: 5 ft 11 in (1.80 m)

Career information
- High school: Bunn (Bunn, North Carolina)
- College: Peace College (1974–1976); NC State (1976–1978)
- Playing career: 1978–1981
- Position: Forward

Career history
- 1978–1980: New York Stars
- 1980–1981: New Jersey Gems

Career highlights and awards
- WBL All-Star (1979)

Kaye Cowher (née Young; April 17, 1956 – July 23, 2010) was an American basketball player. She played college basketball for Peace College and North Carolina State University and later professionally in the Women's Professional Basketball League with the New York Stars and the New Jersey Gems. She was the twin sister of basketball player and coach Faye Young.

== College career ==
After graduating from Bunn High School, Young joined Peace College in 1974 where she played basketball for two seasons. In 1976, she transferred to North Carolina State University where she finished her college career in 1978.

== Personal life ==
Cowher was married to former NFL player and coach Bill Cowher. The couple had three daughters together.

== Death ==
Cowher died in 2010 from skin cancer.
