= Lucille Kyvallos =

Women's collegiate basketball coach

Lucille Kyvallos (born 1932) is an American former women's collegiate basketball coach. Kyvallos coached the Queens College women's basketball team from 1968 through 1981. She is a member of the New York City Basketball Hall of Fame. She served as chair for the Association for Intercollegiate Athletics for Women (AIAW)'s basketball committee and tournament director for the AIAW national championship in 1973. She coached the first women's college basketball game to be played at Madison Square Garden on February 22, 1975. Kyvallos, an advocate for women's sports, wrote: "Women who achieve in sport add a new dimension to the role of women in American society."

== Early life and education ==
Kyvallos was born in Astoria, Queens. She played in recreational basketball leagues growing up, and despite being a strong player, has noted that the lack of opportunity for girls meant she wasn't able to "play on a girls high school or intercollegiate team or [in] the Olympics." Kyvallos attended Springfield College and graduated in 1955. She went on to study at Indiana University for her master's degree in Physical Education.

== Coaching career ==
Kyvallos coached West Chester University's women's basketball team from 1962 to 1966. In her last season with the team, they achieved a 10–0 record. In 1966 Kyvallos started at Queens College, becoming the women's basketball coach in 1968. During her tenure as coach, her Queens College team became a model for the development of high school girls' basketball in New York City and Long Island. As coach, she trained prominent figures in women's basketball, including Donna Orender and Gail Marquis. Other players went on to play professional basketball as well, such as Althea Gwyn and Debbie Mason, or to make an impact in collegiate athletics, such as Sharon Beverly. Kyvallos led the Queens College team to win the National Collegiate Basketball Championship. Her team played in an historic 1975 game against Immaculata College, as it was the first women's college basketball game held at Madison Square Garden.

Kyvallos coached the USA women's basketball team at the 1977 World University Games in Sofia, Bulgaria. She led the team to win a silver medal, losing in the final to the USSR.

In all her coaching endeavors, Kyvallos prioritized strategy and skill building. She emphasized teamwork and confidence, breaking outside of gender roles of the time and advocating for equality between women's and men's teams.

== Honors and awards ==
Kyvallos was selected as Lady Champion's 1976 Coach of The Year and named "The Coach You Would Want to Play For" by WomenSports in 1977.

Kyvallos' 1972–1973 team was inducted into the New York City Basketball Hall of Fame, an honor that she shares. Queens College inducted her into its Athletics Hall of Fame, and renamed the college's basketball court after her, making it the first basketball court in New York City to be named after a woman. The court is noted in the NYC LGBT Historic Sites Project. She was also inducted in Springfield College's Athletics Hall of Fame and the West Chester State College Hall of Fame. Kyvallos will be inducted into the Women's Basketball Hall of Fame in 2025.

Kyvallos won the Joe Lapchick Character Award in 2015.

Kyvallos was featured in an exhibit at the Museum of the City of New York from March 2020 through January 2021.
