= Bill Cowher =

American football player, coach, and analyst (born 1957)

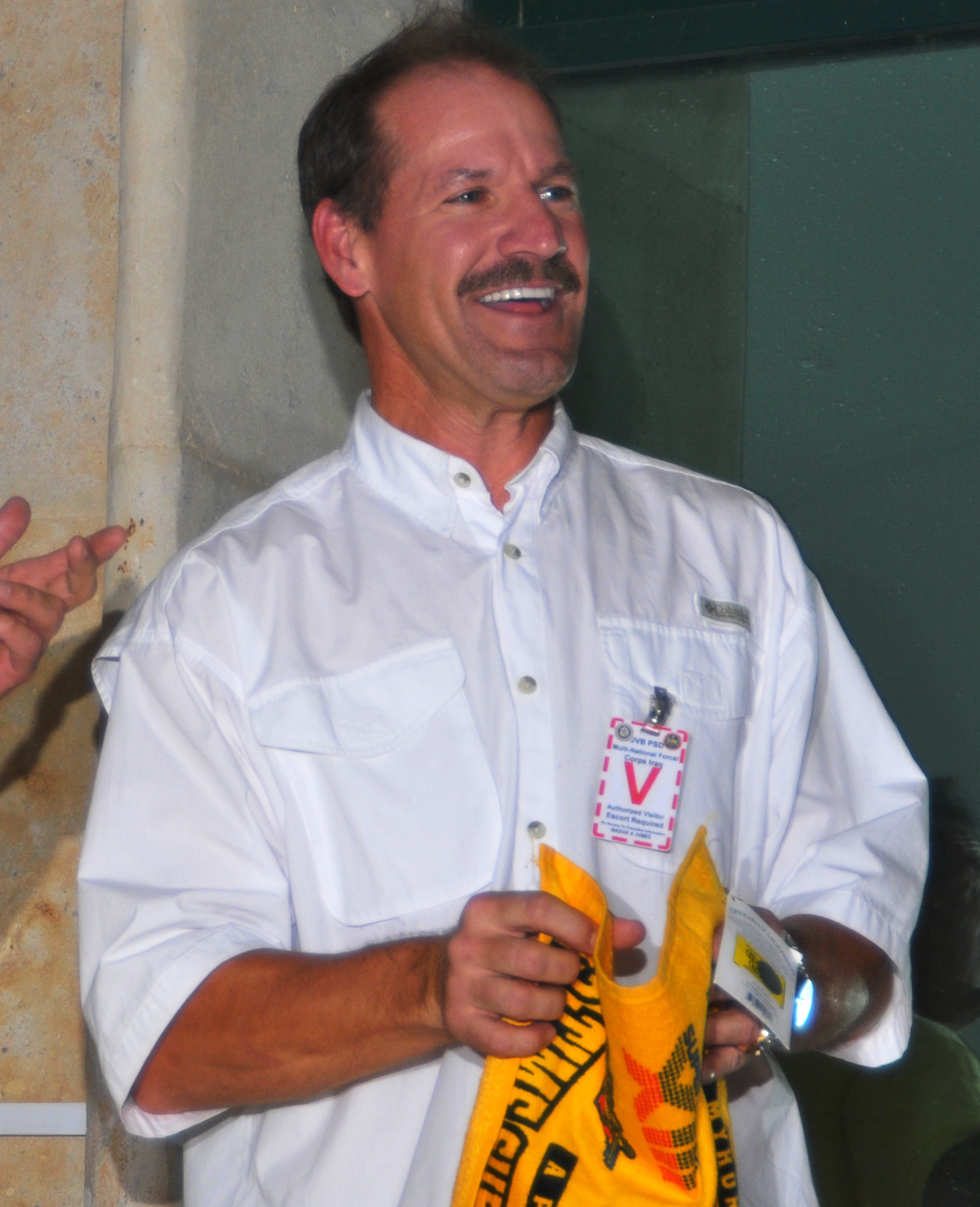
- Cowher in 2009

No. 53, 57
- Position: Linebacker

Personal information
- Born: May 8, 1957 (age 69); Crafton, Pennsylvania, U.S.
- Listed height: 6 ft 3 in (1.91 m)
- Listed weight: 225 lb (102 kg)

Career information
- High school: Carlynton (Pittsburgh, Pennsylvania)
- College: NC State
- NFL draft: 1979: undrafted

Career history

Playing
- Philadelphia Eagles (1979); Cleveland Browns (1980–1982); Philadelphia Eagles (1983–1984)

Coaching
- Cleveland Browns (1985–1988); Special teams coach (1985–1986); Defensive backs coach (1987–1988); Kansas City Chiefs (1989–1991) Defensive coordinator; Pittsburgh Steelers (1992–2006) Head coach

Awards and highlights
- Super Bowl champion (XL); AP NFL Coach of the Year (1992); 2× Sporting News NFL Coach of the Year (1992, 2004); Best Coach/Manager ESPY Award (2006); Pittsburgh Steelers Hall of Honor

Career NFL statistics
- Games played: 45
- Games started: 4
- Fumble recoveries: 1
- Stats at Pro Football Reference

Head coaching record
- Regular season: 149–90–1 (.623)
- Postseason: 12–9 (.571)
- Career: 161–99–1 (.619)
- Coaching profile at Pro Football Reference
- Pro Football Hall of Fame

William Laird Cowher (/ˈkaʊ.ər/; born May 8, 1957) is an American former professional football linebacker and coach who served as the head coach for the Pittsburgh Steelers of the National Football League (NFL) for 15 seasons. He began his coaching career as an assistant under Marty Schottenheimer for the Cleveland Browns and Kansas City Chiefs, serving as the latter's defensive coordinator from 1989 to 1991. In 1992, Cowher was named head coach of the Steelers, a position he held until his retirement following the 2006 season. After retiring, Cowher joined The NFL Today as a studio analyst.

Under Cowher, the Steelers won eight division titles, two AFC Championship Games, and Super Bowl XL. Cowher's Super Bowl victory marked the first championship title for the franchise in over two decades and the first not to be won by Chuck Noll, his predecessor. The Steelers appeared in the postseason 10 times with Cowher, including six consecutive appearances from his 1992 hiring to 1997, which made him the second NFL head coach to reach the playoffs during each of his first six seasons after Paul Brown. Cowher was inducted to the Pro Football Hall of Fame in 2020.

== Early life and college ==
Cowher was born and raised in Crafton, Pennsylvania, a suburb of Pittsburgh. Growing up, he lived only about 5 miles (8 km) from Three Rivers Stadium. Cowher is the son of the late Laird and Dorothy Cowher. His father attended Duquesne University in Pittsburgh's Bluff neighborhood, where he was briefly a classmate with eventual Steelers owner Dan Rooney. Cowher has two brothers, Dale and Doug. The Cowher family resided on Hawthorne Avenue, in Crafton, while Cowher grew up.

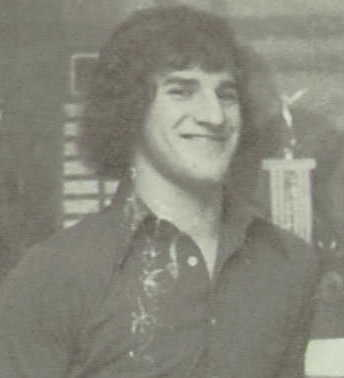
Cowher in 1975

While attending Carlynton High School, Cowher excelled in football, basketball, and track. As a senior, he was named "Most Athletic" and captain of the Cougars football team. Despite his efforts on the field, Cowher was not offered many scholarships as a football player due to being deemed "undersized" for the linebacker position.

When Cowher graduated in 1975, he committed to North Carolina State University, one of the few schools that offered him a scholarship. During his time at NC State, Cowher was a three-year starting linebacker for the Wolfpack. He currently owns the school record for most tackles in a single season with 195. As a senior, Cowher was voted to be a team captain and was named the team's Most Valuable Player (MVP). He graduated from NC State in 1979, receiving a bachelor's degree in education while also preparing for the 1979 NFL Draft.

Cowher's college performance was motivated by making games “personal”. He would often re-read his rejection letters from schools he would play against. Cowher's strategy of playing angry and internalizing personal connections against his opponents would later influence his aggressive coaching style. Cowher once compared himself to Freddy Krueger, stating that he wanted to be his opponents' "worst nightmare".

== Professional career ==
Cowher went undrafted in the 1979 NFL draft. He began his NFL career as a linebacker with the Philadelphia Eagles in 1979, but signed with the Cleveland Browns the following year. Cowher played three seasons from 1980 to 1982 in Cleveland, making him a member of the Kardiac Kids, before being traded back to the Eagles, where he played two more years from 1983 to 1984. His tenure in Philadelphia included tackling a young Jeff Fisher (who later became the head coach of the Tennessee Titans and St. Louis Rams) when playing against the Chicago Bears, causing Fisher to break his leg. The two would later be rival head coaches and friends in the AFC Central division, and Fisher has credited his injury at the hands of Cowher with having the unintended consequence of propelling him into coaching.

Cowher primarily played special teams during his playing career; subsequently, he placed emphasis on special teams during his coaching career. Cowher credits being a "bubble player" during his playing career with influencing his coaching career, feeling that such players work the hardest for a roster spot (and sometimes still get cut, hence the term "bubble player"), and thus make better head coaches than those with successful playing careers.

== Coaching career ==
=== Assistant jobs ===
Cowher began his coaching career in 1985 at age 28 under Marty Schottenheimer with the Cleveland Browns. Cowher, who had played under Schottenheimer in Cleveland when Schottenheimer was the team's defensive coordinator, stated that he took a coaching position despite taking a significant pay cut from what he would have made as a player with the Eagles in 1985 because he saw his fortunes as a player limited and saw more of a future as a coach.

Cowher was the Browns' special teams coach in 1985–86 and secondary coach in 1987–88, during which he formed a bond with New York Giants defensive coordinator Bill Belichick and helped Belichick learn how to coach defensive backs while teaching Cowher how to coach linebackers. Belichick was impressed enough with Cowher that he and Giants head coach Bill Parcells offered to make Cowher the Giants defensive backs coach following Schottenheimer's sudden departure from Cleveland in 1988, but Cowher opted to remain loyal to Schottenheimer.

Following Schottenheimer to the Kansas City Chiefs in 1989, Cowher was named defensive coordinator, becoming close with legendary Chiefs linebacker Derrick Thomas. He interviewed with the Browns for their head coaching vacancy in 1991 before losing out to close friend Belichick; it is believed that Cowher's young age at the time played a factor in losing out to Belichick. Cowher was a finalist for the Cincinnati Bengals head coaching position in 1991 following the dismissal of Sam Wyche, but was passed over in favor of Dave Shula.

=== Pittsburgh Steelers ===
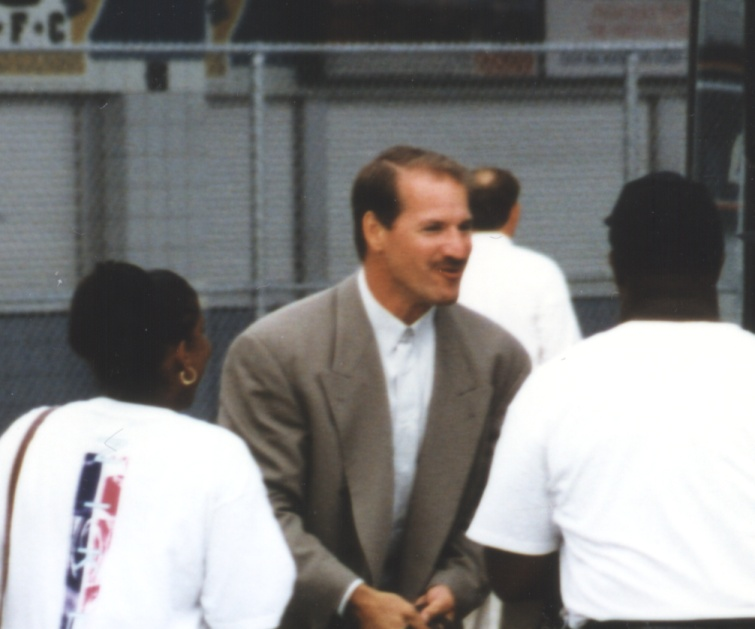
Cowher in 1996

Cowher became the 15th head coach in Steelers history when he succeeded Chuck Noll on January 21, 1992 – but only the team's second head coach since the NFL merger in 1970, beating out fellow Pittsburgh native and Pitt alumnus (and eventual Pitt head coach) Dave Wannstedt (Wannstedt instead became the coach of the Chicago Bears the following season). Cowher continued a trend for the Steelers hiring coaches in their 30s that dates back to Joe Bach who began coaching the Steelers in 1935 when they were still named the Pittsburgh Pirates.

Under Cowher, the Steelers showed an immediate improvement from the disappointing 7–9 season the year before, going 11–5 and earning home-field advantage in the AFC after the Steelers had missed the playoffs six times out of the previous seven years. His first season as a head coach came to an end in the AFC Divisional round on January 9, 1993, against the Buffalo Bills in which the Steelers would lose 24–3.

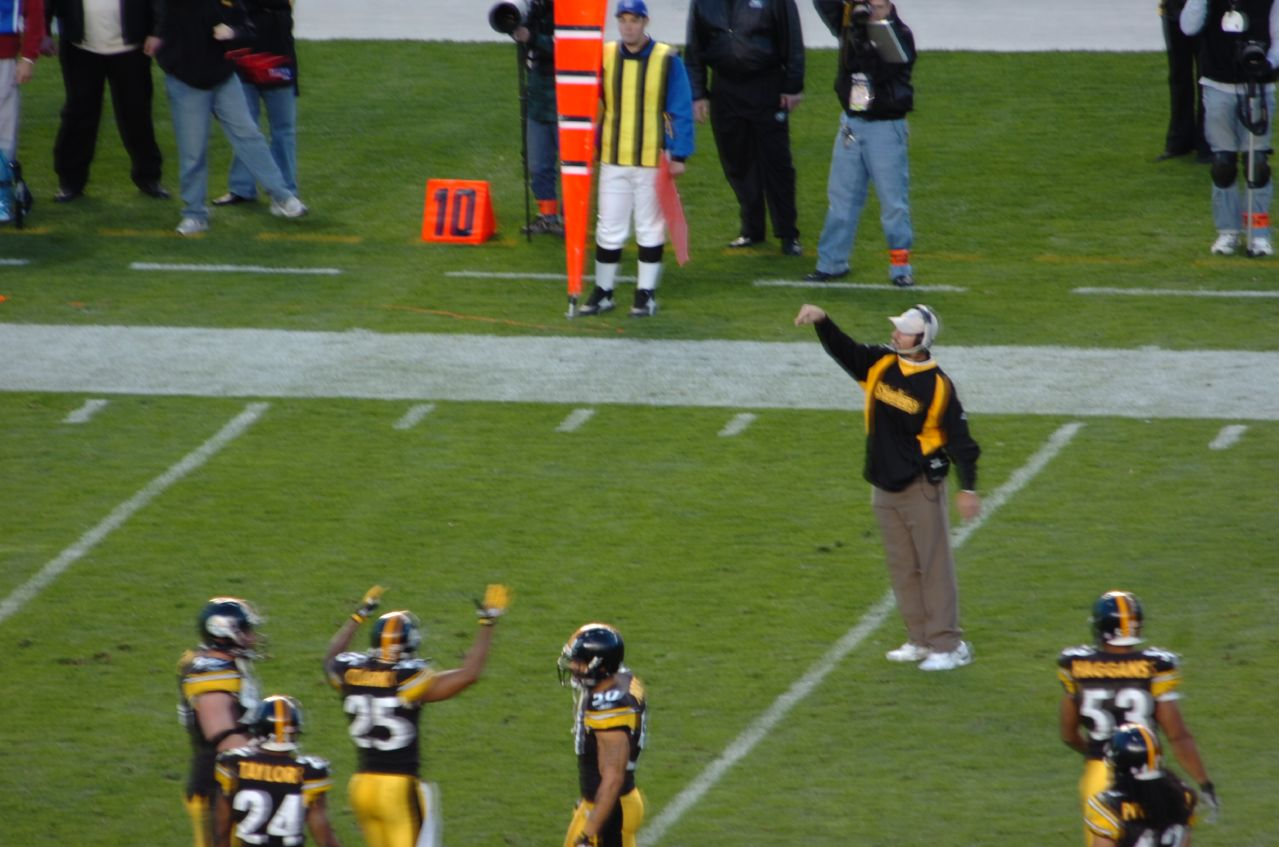
Cowher challenges a play

The following season ended with a record of 9–7 for the Steelers. Under Cowher, the team scored a total of 308 points and allowed just 281 points against them. Though the Steelers fell 27–24 in the Wild Card Round to the Kansas City Chiefs, it became the first time in a decade the Steelers had back-to-back playoff appearances.

In the 1995 regular season, Cowher got the team to record 11 wins and five losses, once again sending them to the playoffs and earned them a first round bye. The Steelers were able to defeat the Buffalo Bills, who were coming off of four straight Super Bowl appearances, 40–24 and recorded a 20–16 victory against the Indianapolis Colts. Their win against the Colts made the Steelers AFC Champions for the first time since the 1979 season. At age 38, he became the youngest coach to lead his team to a Super Bowl, which the Steelers lost 27–17 to the Dallas Cowboys. Cowher is only the second coach in NFL history to lead his team to the playoffs in each of his first six seasons as head coach, joining Pro Football Hall of Fame member Paul Brown.

In 1998, Cowher led the team to their first losing season of his tenure, breaking a six-year streak of playoff teams. With quarterback Kordell Stewart at the helm, Cowher and the team finished with a record of 7-9 and placing third in the AFC Central. The following season, Pittsburgh would see a second consecutive losing season for the first time since the 1985 and 1986 seasons. Despite a 4–3 start to the season heading into the bye week, the Steelers would go 2–7 on the remainder of the season to finish with a record of 6–10.

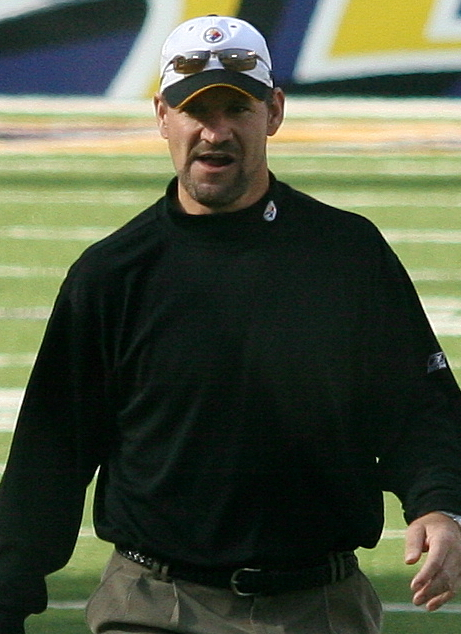
Cowher in 2006

During the late 1990s and early 2000s, Cowher became known for drafting lineman with first round picks, which drew criticism from Steelers fans. During his tenure, the team had mixed results with this strategy, drafting future Hall of Famer Alan Faneca and future Pro Bowlers Leon Searcy & Casey Hampton but also drafting Jamain Stephens (who would go on to be one of the team's biggest first-round busts) and Kendall Simmons (a solid starter but plagued by injuries and a sudden diagnosis of type 1 diabetes), with Stephens infamously being cut after failing the 40-yard dash on the first day of training camp. Between 1992 and 2002, the Steelers drafted five linemen on both the defensive and offensive sides in the first round, making up nearly half of Cowher's first round picks in the first decade of his tenure. Defendants of this strategy pointed out that of the five lineman drafted, only Stephens was a bonafide bust and of the skill position players the Steelers did draft with their first round picks (Deon Figures, Charles Johnson, Mark Bruener, Chad Scott, Troy Edwards, and Plaxico Burress), with the exception of Bruener--who despite being a tight end was more of a blocking tight end and a de facto sixth offensive lineman when he played--and to a lesser extent Scott and Burress largely didn't live up to expectations, though only Edwards would be a bust. (Notably, the Steelers drafted Edwards and Burress, both wide receivers, despite having third-round pick Hines Ward already on their roster to replace Johnson and Yancey Thigpen following their departures in free agency; Ward would outright supplant Edwards on the depth chart by 2000.) Cowher's draft picks began to focus on skill positions in 2003 when cornerstone defensive back Troy Polamalu was taken with the 16th overall pick.

The 2003 season would prove challenging for Cowher and the Steelers when the team was only able to win six of their 16 regular season games, missing the playoffs. Due to their poor record, it allowed for Cowher's team to draft Ben Roethlisberger with the 11th overall pick in the 2004 NFL draft. Cowher did not initially want to select Roethlisberger in the first round as he was "comfortable" with starter Tommy Maddox and backup Charlie Batch. His original decision was to draft Shawn Andrews, an offensive tackle from the University of Arkansas. Before the pick could be sent in during the draft, Steelers owner Dan Rooney overrode the decision and took Roethlisberger.

Cowher and the team would rebound from their previous season with a record of 15–1, earning a first round bye in the playoffs yet again. The Steelers would make another AFC Championship appearance, losing 41–27 to eventual Super Bowl champions the New England Patriots.

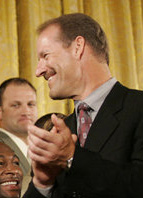
Cowher with the Steelers at the White House following their Super Bowl XL victory

In 2005, the Steelers were able to clinch a spot in the playoffs with an 11–5 record as the #6-seed in the AFC. The Steelers led an upset playoff run, including a 21–18 victory over the Indianapolis Colts, the top seeded team in the AFC. Cowher would win his second AFC Championship on January 22, 2006, when the Steelers defeated the Denver Broncos 34–17. On February 5, 2006, Cowher's Pittsburgh Steelers won Super Bowl XL by defeating the Seattle Seahawks 21–10, giving Cowher his first Super Bowl ring and making the Steelers the first sixth seed to win a Super Bowl in NFL history. Including the Super Bowl, Cowher's teams over the years had compiled a record of 108–1–1 in games in which they built a lead of at least 11 points.

On January 5, 2007, Cowher resigned after 15 years of being the Steelers head coach, citing a desire to spend more time with family. Cowher's record as a head coach was 161–99–1, including the playoffs. He was succeeded by Mike Tomlin. In Cowher's 15 seasons, the Steelers captured eight division titles, earned 10 postseason playoff berths (including six straight in his first six seasons), played in 21 playoff games, advanced to six AFC Championship games and made two Super Bowl appearances. He is one of only six coaches in NFL history to claim at least seven division titles. At the conclusion of the 2005 season, the Steelers had the best record of any team in the NFL since Cowher was hired as head coach.

On January 11, 2020, Cowher was told live on a CBS pregame show that he was being inducted into the Pro Football Hall of Fame as part of its centennial class by its president David Baker.

==== Coaching philosophy and legacy ====
Much like his mentor Marty Schottenheimer, Cowher believed in a strong defense with an emphasis on special teams performance, complimented by a strong running game on offense. Unlike the conservative Schottenheimer, however, Cowher was known to take more risks, including going for it on fourth down, such as his first game as a head coach against the Houston Oilers when he had punter Mark Royals throw a fake punt to Warren Williams, putting the Steelers near the goal line.

Unlike the stoic Noll, Cowher was known to be more fiery and emotional, specifically with his jaw line when he was angry and being known as "the Chin". This was exemplified in a 1995 game against the Minnesota Vikings when the referees mistakenly penalized the Steelers for 12 men on the field following a missed field goal. The Vikings made the subsequent rekick despite Cowher's protests that they had the regulated 11 players on the field, and stuffed an "all-22" photo as proof into referee Gordon McCarter's pocket, leading to a $7,500 fine by the NFL for Cowher putting his hands on an official. Cowher is also known for being a vocal supporter of the coaching profession in general and was upset that the Indianapolis Colts hired former center Jeff Saturday as interim head coach in 2022 despite having no coaching experience above the high school level and the team having several assistants already on the staff with previous head coaching experience.

== After coaching ==
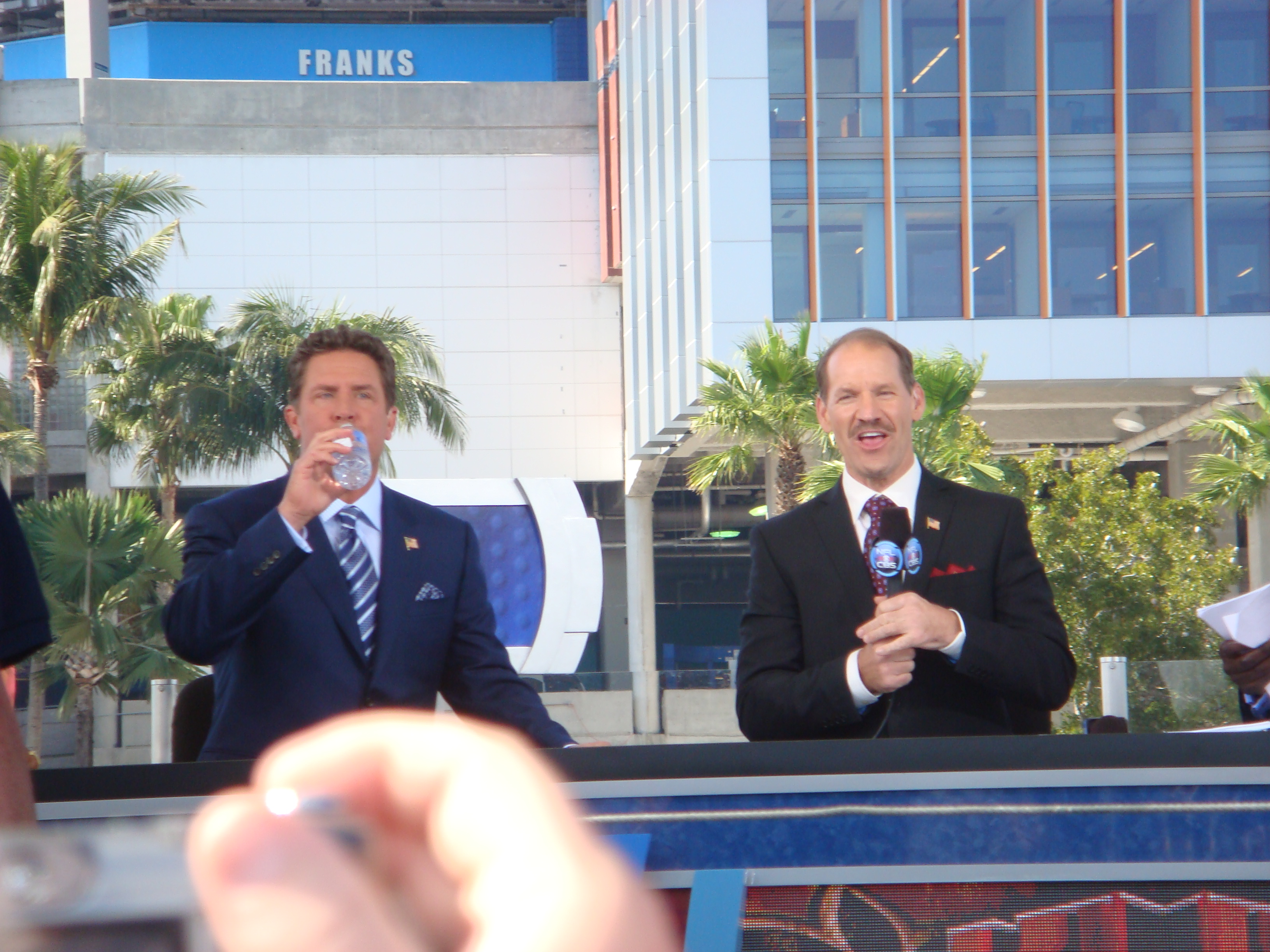
Dan Marino and Cowher during a CBS Pre-game Show in 2010

On February 15, 2007, Cowher signed on to The NFL Today on CBS as a studio analyst, joining Dan Marino, Shannon Sharpe, and Boomer Esiason. Cowher also serves as a host of the NFL's CBS Halftime Report. In November 2024, he confirmed that he would re-sign with CBS in 2025, keeping him as a host for 19 years.

In 2007, Cowher appeared in the ABC reality television series Fast Cars and Superstars: The Gillette Young Guns Celebrity Race, featuring a dozen celebrities in a stock car racing competition. He matched up against Gabrielle Reece and William Shatner.

On March 4, 2008, Cowher responded to rumors concerning his coaching future by stating, "I'm not going anywhere." The rumors started after the Cowhers placed their Raleigh, North Carolina home on the market, but their intention was to build a new house two miles away.

Putting an end to numerous unfounded rumors of his return to coaching in the NFL in 2009, Cowher stated on The NFL Today that he did not plan to coach again in the immediate future.

In July 2010, Cowher was the keynote speaker for National Agents Alliance at their Leadership Conference. He talked about work ethic, leadership and how that transfers into the work force. Cowher said that it is not about what you accomplish, it is about who you touch along the way.

Cowher had a part in the movie The Dark Knight Rises (2012), which was filmed at Heinz Field, the home of the Steelers, on Pittsburgh's North Side. He played the head coach of the Gotham Rogues.

In May 2023, Cowher reunited with Ben Roethlisberger on Roethlisberger's podcast Footbahlin with Ben Roethlisberger.

On August 11, 2023, NC State announced that Cowher would be inducted into its Ring of Honor with the ceremony taking place before the Wolfpack's September 29 game versus Louisville.

== Coaching tree ==
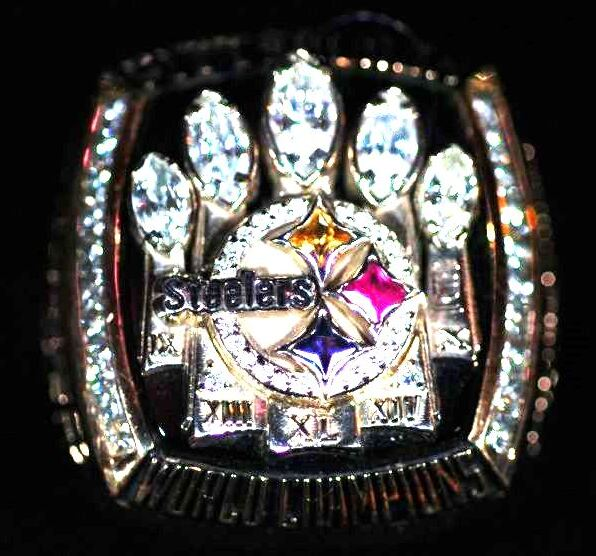
The Steelers' Super Bowl XL ring, showing all five Lombardi trophies won by the Steelers up to that point

Assistant coaches under Cowher that became head coaches in the NFL or NCAA:

- Dom Capers: Carolina Panthers (1995–1998), Houston Texans (2002–2005)
- Chan Gailey: Dallas Cowboys (1998–1999), Georgia Tech (2002–2007), Buffalo Bills (2010–2012)
- Jim Haslett: New Orleans Saints (2000–2005), St. Louis Rams (2008)
- Dick LeBeau: Cincinnati Bengals (2000–2002)
- Marvin Lewis: Cincinnati Bengals (2003–2018)
- Mike Mularkey: Buffalo Bills (2004–2005), Jacksonville Jaguars (2012), Tennessee Titans (2015–2017)
- Ken Whisenhunt: Arizona Cardinals (2007–2012), Tennessee Titans (2014–2015)
- Bruce Arians: Indianapolis Colts (2012, interim), Arizona Cardinals (2013–2017), Tampa Bay Buccaneers (2019–2021)
- David Culley: Houston Texans (2021)

Players under Cowher that became head coaches in the NFL:

- Mike Vrabel: Tennessee Titans (2018–2023), New England Patriots (2025–present)

== Personal life ==
Cowher's late wife, Kaye (née Young), also a North Carolina State University graduate, played professional basketball for the New York Stars of the (now-defunct) Women's Professional Basketball League with her twin sister, Faye. Kaye was featured in the book Mad Seasons: The Story of the First Women's Professional Basketball League, 1978–1981, by Karra Porter (University of Nebraska Press, 2006). Kaye Cowher died of skin cancer at age 54 on July 23, 2010. The couple had three daughters: Meagan, Lauren, and Lindsay. Meagan and Lauren played basketball at Princeton University. Lindsay played basketball at Wofford College before transferring to Elon University. In 2007, the Cowher family moved to Raleigh, North Carolina, from the Pittsburgh suburb of Fox Chapel. Meagan married former NHL forward Kevin Westgarth in 2011. Lindsay married former NBA forward Ryan Kelly of the Atlanta Hawks on August 2, 2014.

Cowher married Veronica Stigeler in 2014. In 2018, Cowher put his Raleigh house in North Ridge Country Club up for sale after announcing he would be moving to New York full-time.

Cowher co-authored an autobiography, Heart and Steel, in 2021.

== Endorsements ==
Cowher was on the cover of EA Sports' 2006 video game NFL Head Coach. He appears in TV advertising for Time Warner Cable. In the video game Madden NFL 19, Cowher voiced himself in the mini-game Longshot 2: Homecoming. In the mini-game, he makes his return to coaching as the head coach of the Houston Texans.

== Head coaching record ==
Team	Year	Regular season					Postseason			
Team	Year	Won	Lost	Ties	Win %	Finish	Won	Lost	Win %	Result
PIT	1992	11	5	0	.688	1st in AFC Central	0	1	.000	Lost to Buffalo Bills in AFC Divisional Game
PIT	1993	9	7	0	.563	2nd in AFC Central	0	1	.000	Lost to Kansas City Chiefs in AFC Wild Card Game
PIT	1994	12	4	0	.750	1st in AFC Central	1	1	.500	Lost to San Diego Chargers in AFC Championship Game
PIT	1995	11	5	0	.688	1st in AFC Central	2	1	.667	Lost to Dallas Cowboys in Super Bowl XXX
PIT	1996	10	6	0	.625	1st in AFC Central	1	1	.500	Lost to New England Patriots in AFC Divisional Game
PIT	1997	11	5	0	.688	1st in AFC Central	1	1	.500	Lost to Denver Broncos in AFC Championship Game
PIT	1998	7	9	0	.438	3rd in AFC Central	–	–	–	–
PIT	1999	6	10	0	.375	4th in AFC Central	–	–	–	–
PIT	2000	9	7	0	.563	3rd in AFC Central	–	–	–	–
PIT	2001	13	3	0	.812	1st in AFC Central	1	1	.500	Lost to New England Patriots in AFC Championship Game
PIT	2002	10	5	1	.656	1st in AFC North	1	1	.500	Lost to Tennessee Titans in AFC Divisional Game
PIT	2003	6	10	0	.375	3rd in AFC North	–	–	–	–
PIT	2004	15	1	0	.938	1st in AFC North	1	1	.500	Lost to New England Patriots in AFC Championship Game
PIT	2005	11	5	0	.688	2nd in AFC North	4	0	1.000	Super Bowl XL champions
PIT	2006	8	8	0	.500	3rd in AFC North	–	–	–	–
PIT Total		149	90	1	.623		12	9	.571	
Total		149	90	1	.623		12	9	.571	

== See also ==
- List of NFL head coach wins leaders
- List of North Carolina State University people
- List of Super Bowl head coaches
