= Retha Swindell =

Former American basketball player

Retha Swindell is an American retired athlete. She was the first black woman to play with the Texas Longhorns women's basketball team and was one of the UT women's basketball program's first two All-Americans. During her tenure, she scored 1,795 points and 1,759 rebounds.

== College and Professional Career ==
Following the passage of Title IX, the landscape of women’s athletics began to shift—and Retha Swindell stood ready to seize the moment. As the Texas Longhorns women’s basketball program transitioned from an intramural team to a varsity sport, Swindell was among the early athletes who helped build its foundation."Title IX impact". Newspapers.com. Though she initially played as a guard, she adapted quickly, learning new skills such as post play and shooting, a testament to her versatility and relentless work ethic."Swindell adapts to Longhorn role". Newspapers.com."Building the Longhorn legacy". Newspapers.com.

Swindell’s freshman year was marked by a bold achievement: she advanced to the final cuts of the 1976 Montreal Olympic women’s basketball team tryouts—an extraordinary accomplishment for a first-year collegiate player."Swindell nears Olympic dreams". Newspapers.com.

Her junior season showcased her growing dominance on the court, as she averaged 11 points per game, posted 19 points and 17 rebounds in the season opener, and shifted her academic focus from computer science to physical education to better align with her passion for sports."Swindell grows into star". Newspapers.com. By season’s end, she earned selection to the prestigious United States international touring team, further cementing her status as one of the country’s rising stars."Swindell earns international nod". Newspapers.com.

In her senior year, Swindell anchored the Longhorns’ frontcourt, averaging 9.0 points, 8.4 rebounds, and leading the team in blocked shots. Her leadership and impact earned her team MVP honors for the second time. She closed out her collegiate career with remarkable totals: 1,795 points and 1,759 rebounds—leaving her name etched among the university’s all-time greats."Swindell's legacy at Texas". Newspapers.com.

In June 1979, Swindell was selected 13th overall by the Chicago Hustle in the inaugural Women’s Professional Basketball League (WBL) draft, stepping into history as one of the pioneers of professional women’s basketball."Swindell joins Chicago Hustle". Newspapers.com. She spent one season with the Hustle before being traded to the Milwaukee Express. After the Express folded, Swindell continued her journey with the Dallas Diamonds, helping propel the team to a championship game appearance against Nebraska."Swindell leads Diamonds charge". Newspapers.com.

Following her professional career, Swindell remained committed to growing the game, serving on the United States Select women’s basketball team and later stepping into coaching. In 1986, she was named head coach of the girls’ varsity basketball program at Robert E. Lee High School, passing on her experience and passion to the next generation of athletes."Swindell takes coaching reins". Newspapers.com.

In recognition of her trailblazing contributions to Texas athletics, Swindell was inducted into the University of Texas’ Women’s Athletics Hall of Honor in 2001, securing her place among the legends who helped shape the future of women’s sports."UT honors Swindell's legacy". Newspapers.com.

== Career ==
Following the passing of Title IX, the Texas Longhorns women's basketball transitioned from an intramural sport to a varsity sport. Upon joining the team, she changed her position from guard and had to learn how to shoot the ball. As a freshman, Swindell made it to the final cuts of the 1976 Montreal Olympic women's basketball team tryouts. As a junior, she averaged 11 points per game and hit 19 in the 1977–78 season's opener while recording 17 rebounds. She also changed her major from computer science to physical education. At the conclusion of the season, Swindell earned a place on the United States international touring team. In her senior season, Swindell averaged 9.0 points and 8.4 rebounds while also leading the team in blocked shots. As such, she was nominated team MVP for the second time in her career. Swindell concluded her collegiate career with 1,795 points and 1,759 rebounds. In June 1979, Swindell was drafted 13th overall by the Chicago Hustle of the Women's Professional Basketball League.

Upon graduating from UT, Swindell spent time with the United States Select women's basketball team and two-years in the now-defunct Women's Professional Basketball League. She spent one season with the Chicago Hustle before being traded to the Milwaukee Express who subsequently folded. As such, she joined the Dallas Diamonds as a free agent and helped them to the championship game against Nebraska. In 1986, Swindell replaced Gloria Pruitt as head coach of the girl's varsity basketball program at Robert E. Lee High School. In 2001, Swindell was recognized for her collegiate career with an induction into the University of Texas' Women's Athletics Hall of Honor.
