= Donna Orender =

American sports executive and former basketball player

Donna Geils Orender
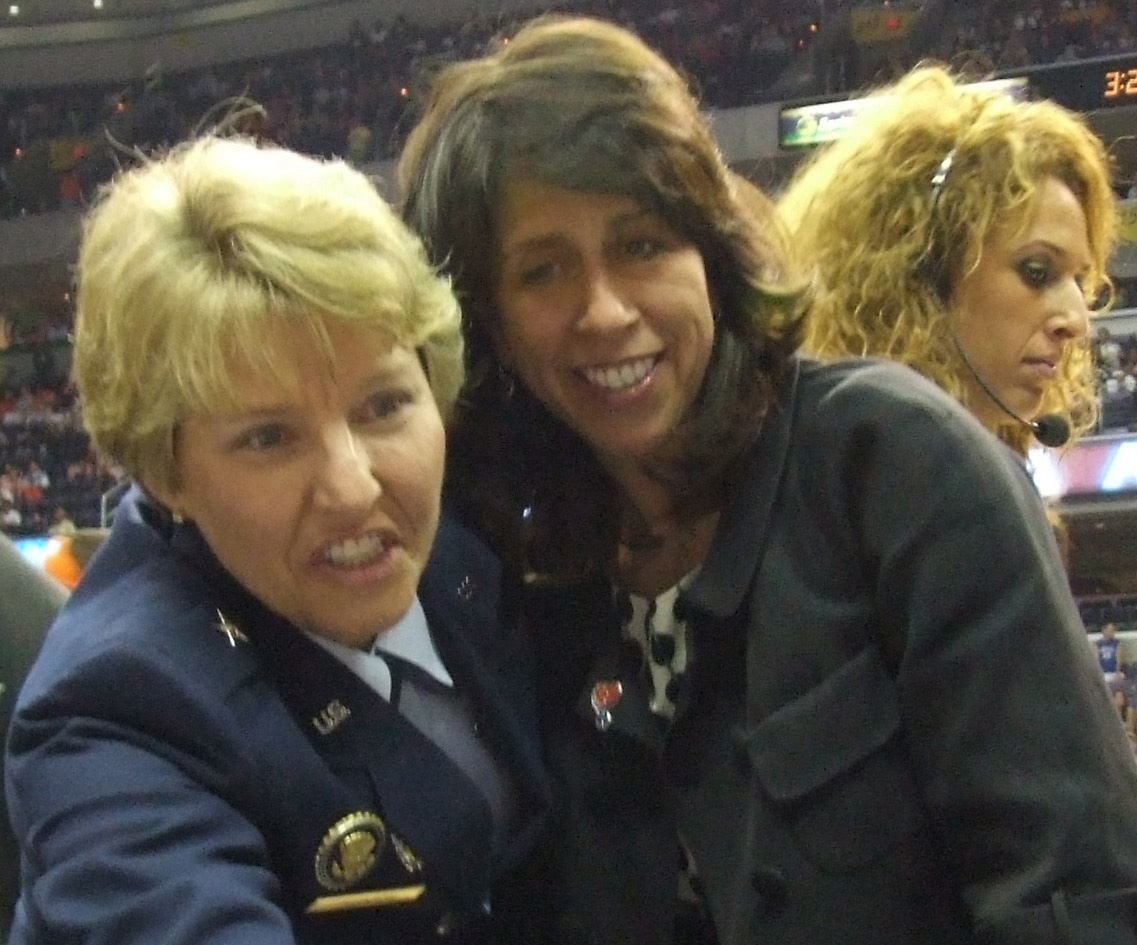
- Orender (center) in 2007

2nd President of the WNBA
- In office February 15, 2005 – December 31, 2010
- Preceded by: Val Ackerman
- Succeeded by: Laurel J. Richie

Personal details
- Born: February 14, 1957 (age 69) Long Island, New York, U.S.
- Spouse: M.G. Orender
- Children: 4
- Education: Queens College, City University of New York; Adelphi University
- Known for: collegiate and professional basketball player; senior vice president of the PGA; president of the Women's National Basketball Association (WNBA)
- Basketball career

Personal information
- Listed height: 5 ft 7 in (1.70 m)

Career information
- High school: Elmont (Elmont, New York)
- College: Queens (1974–1978)
- Position: Point guard

Career history

Playing
- 1978–1979: New York Stars
- 1979–1980: New Jersey Gems
- 1980–1981: Chicago Hustle

Coaching
- 1979: New York Stars

Career highlights
- As player: WBL All-Star (1980)
- Stats at Basketball Reference

Donna Geils Orender (born February 14, 1957) is a sports executive and a former collegiate and professional basketball player. She was formerly president of the Women's National Basketball Association (WNBA), and senior vice president of the PGA. She played college basketball for Queens College in New York and later professionally in the Women's Professional Basketball League, the first women's pro league in the United States, for three seasons.

== Early life ==
Orender was born in Long Island, New York, grew up in Queens, New York, and in Elmont, New York on Long Island, and is Jewish. She belonged to a Conservative synagogue (the Elmont Jewish Center). She attended and played basketball for Elmont High School, in Elmont, New York, and was a five-sport athlete in high school, also lettering in field hockey, volleyball, softball, and tennis. According to Orender, Elmont High School did not have a girls’ tennis team while she was attending, so she asked the coach to play for the boys’ team. The coach agreed to let her try out for the team, and in doing so she beat her opponent and became the first girl to play tennis for the high school, which gained little attention to her surprise.

== Playing career ==
=== College years ===
Orender turned down an academic scholarship to the University of Chicago to instead attend Queens College in New York City, New York to play basketball for Lucille Kyvallos. Queens College was invited to play Immaculata at Madison Square Garden on February 22, 1975. The matchup was the first ever college women's basketball game in the arena. Orender graduated from Queens College in 1978 with a bachelor's degree in psychology. While at Queens College she was an All-American basketball player. In 2012 Orender was inducted into the Queens College Athletics Hall of Fame.

After graduating from Queens College, Orender attended Adelphi University to pursue her master's degree in social work. She dropped out of the program after one year to play professional basketball for the Women's Pro Basketball League (WBL). Adelphi University presented Orender with an honorary doctor of law degree in 2007.

=== Professional career ===
Under the name Donna Geils, Orender played three seasons in the Women's Pro Basketball League (WBL), where she was an All-Star, and one of only 20 women to play in all three seasons of the league. During that time, she played for the New York Stars (1978–79), New Jersey Gems (1979–80), and Chicago Hustle (1980–81). During her second season, she averaged a career hight 18.8 points and 4.5 assists and was named to the All-Star team. Orender's WBL career is featured in the book Mad Seasons: The Story of the First Women's Basketball League, 1978–1981, by Karra Porter (University of Nebraska Press, 2006). The WBL was disbanded in 1981.

Orender still holds two records for most field goals made, and is currently ranked 34th with 249 field goals made in the 1979–1980 season and ranked 7th for most turnovers in a single season, with 191 also in the 1979–1980 season. Both records were set as a part of the New Jersey Gems. When the league shutdown in 1981, Orender wrote an article for The Times called "Making a Dream Come True, and Watching it Fade Away."

=== National team career ===
In 1985, she was the captain of the United States national team at the 1985 Maccabiah Games in Israel.

== Later life ==
=== Television production (1981–1987) ===
Orender's television production career began as a production assistant at ABC Sports and continued at the Sports Channel. Orender also owned her own production and marketing company, Primo Donna Productions.

=== Professional Golfer's Association (PGA) Tour (1987–2005) ===
In 1987, Orender started working for the PGA Tour, where she oversaw their global television and production businesses. By 1989, she was the original producer of Inside the PGA Tour, a half-hour highlights show. In 1997 she negotiated a $400 million TV contract with the networks for the PGA Tour. In 2001, she became the senior vice president of strategic development in the Office of the Commissioner. Orender spent 17 years with the PGA.

=== Women's National Basketball Association (WNBA) (2005–2011) ===
In February 2005, Orender was named the new WNBA president, succeeding Val Ackerman. Her responsibilities included the oversight of all league operations including both the business and competitive aspects of the league. During her tenure, she negotiated an eight-year contract extension with Disney/ABC/ESPN which, for the first time, included broadcast rights fees and a six-year Collective Bargaining agreement. On December 3, 2010, it was announced that Orender would be stepping down from her post effective December 31, 2010. NBA Vice President Chris Granger was tabbed to replace her on an interim basis until Laurel Richie was the named the new president.

During her time with the organization Orender notes attendance growth, development on ESPN, and broadcast development are all highlights that she is proud to have played a role in. In an interview with Jackson Daily Record Orender discusses her decision to step down as president was in part due to her twin sons. She wanted to be around for them as they were growing up, and as they needed her more.

=== UPSHOT League (2026) ===
She is set to be the inaugural commissioner of the UpShot League, a new developmental women's professional basketball league in the United States, set to have its debut season in May 2026.

=== Advocacy and entrepreneurship (Since 2011) ===
==== Generation W ====
In 2011, Orender registered and launched a 501c3, non-profit organization called Generation W. The nonprofit provided mentorships and education to women. Orender served as CEO of the organization.

==== Orender Unlimited, LLC. ====
In the same year, Orender also launched Orender Unlmited, a consulting and advisory firm based in Jacksonville, Florida. This organization focuses on marketing, media, and diversity strategies for its clientele. She has been the CEO since it launched in 2011.

Through both of her organizations, Orender has been invited to be the keynote and motivational speaker for many events around the nation. She has also been a global ambassador for Vital Voices, traveling to India to help mentor young women entrepreneurs. In 2016, she gave a TEDx Talk presentation in Jacksonville, FL. In July 2018, Orender published a book titled WOWsdom! The Girl's Guide to the Positive and the Possible (Mascot Books, July 10, 2018).

Donna Orender has been appointed and elected to serve on several organizations' executive board committees:

- Monique Burr Foundation for Children (board member)
- V Foundation for Cancer Research (board member)
- United Jewish Appeal (UJA) Sports for Youth Initiative (co-chair)
- Brooks College of Health at the University of North Florida (advisory board)
- DeVos Graduate Sports Business Management program at the University of Central Florida (advisory board)
- World Surfing League (WSL) (founding board member, 2013)

== Personal life ==
In 1990, Orender moved from New York to Jacksonville Beach, Florida, where she resides with her husband. She is a member of the Jacksonville Jewish Center. She is a member of Sigma Gamma Rho.

Orender met her future husband Carnace (MG) Orender while both were working for PGA of America. MG has held several professional roles in the golf community such as president of Hamilton Golf, Inc. and many positions within the PGA America organization including PGA President from 2003 – 2004. The two were married in 1994 and have two children together, twin brothers Jacob and Zachary. Jacob was a guard for the California Golden Bears basketball team and graduated from Cal. Zachary is completing his bachelor's degree at Tulane University. During her time as president of the WNBA, Orender lived and worked in New York, while her husband stayed in Jacksonville with the couple's children.

From her marriage, Orender is also mother to two stepchildren, Morgan and Colleen Orender. Morgan is an associate attorney practicing law in Jacksonville, Florida, and Colleen is a singer based in Nashville, Tennessee.

Orender is friends with Ann Meyers Drysdale, whom she met in 1979 while playing in the WBL. The two played together for the New Jersey Gems.

== Honors and awards ==
- Fox Sports Network ranked Donna Orender in the top ten most powerful women in sports (2005)
- Sporting News's annual "Power List" in 2005
- Inducted into the National Jewish Sports Hall of Fame (2006)
- March of Dimes Sports Leadership Award (2006)
- Women in Sports and Events (WISE) Woman of the Year Award (2007)
- Queens College Athletics Hall of Fame (2012)
- Elected to the International Jewish Sports Hall of Fame (2015)
- Business Week's Power 100 Sports issue
- Honored by the UJA-Federation of New York's Entertainment, Media and Communications Division
  - Youth for Sports, Chair
  - Entertainment, Media & Communications Division Executive Committee, Vice Chair
- Newsweek 100 Most Influential People in Sports

== Writing ==
During an interview in 2011 with Athlon Sports following her announcement that she would be stepping down as President of the WNBA, Orender mentioned writing a book among her professional goals. Orender has several writing credits to her name:

- My Dad and Me by Larry King, contributor
- WOWsdom! The Girl's Guide to the Positive and the Possible, author
- Barnstorming America Stories from the Pioneers of Women's Basketball, co-author
- The Leaderboard: Conversations on Golf and Life, contributor
- Articles published with Sports Illustrated, Street and Smith's Sports Business Journal, and The Times

== See also ==
- List of select Jewish basketball players
