= Vonnie Tomich =

American basketball player

Personal information
- Listed height: 5 ft 6 in (1.68 m)

Career information
- College: Illinois State (1974–1978)
- Position: Point guard

Career history

Playing
- 1978–1979: Dayton Rockettes
- 1979: California Dreams
- 1979: St. Louis Streak
- 1979–1980: Dallas Diamonds
- 1980–1981: Chicago Hustle
- 198?: Marburg
- 1984: Chicago Spirit

Coaching
- 1984: Chicago Spirit

Career highlights
- As player: WBL All-Star (1979); WBL All Pro (1979)
- Stats at Basketball Reference

Vonnie Tomich is an American former basketball player. She played college basketball for the Illinois State University. She played professionally in the Women's Professional Basketball League (WBL) from 1978 to 1981. After the WBL folded, she played for Marburg in Germany before returning to the United States and as a player-coach for the Chicago Spirit of the Women's American Basketball Association.
