= Cardie Hicks =

American basketball player

Personal information
- Born: c.1955/1956
- Listed height: 5 ft 9 in (1.75 m)

Career information
- High school: San Pedro
- College: Long Beach State Beach (1973–1976); Cal State-Northridge (1976–1977)
- Playing career: 1977–1994
- Position: Guard/forward/center

Career history
- 197?–?: Oud-Beijerland
- 1979–1981: San Francisco Pioneers

Career highlights
- WBL All-Star (1981)
- Stats at Basketball Reference

Cardie Hicks, also known as Cardte Hicks, is an American former basketball player. Reportedly having a 40-inch vertical leap, she is one of the first women known to have dunked in a professional game, doing so while playing professionally in the Netherlands in 1978.

Nicknamed "Magic", she played basketball at San Pedro High School where she won the Los Angeles City girls' basketball championship in 1972. She attended Long Beach State on a basketball scholarship for three years before transferring to California State University, Northridge for her senior year. During her senior season, she averaged 16.0 points in 15 games.

Following her college career, she played professionally in the Netherland for two seasons where she gained notability in 1978 after having a two-handed alley-oop dunk. She later played two seasons in the Women's Professional Basketball League (WBL) for the San Francisco Pioneers, averaging 15.7 points in 43 games. She missed the majority of her first season, due to a stress fracture in both legs. In February 1981, she was selected to play in the WBL All-Star game. Following the folding of WBL in 1981, Hicks returned to Europe, playing until 1994, including in Italy and Sweden. In 1997, she tried out for the WNBA Sacramento Monarchs at age 41 but knee problems knocked her out.
