= Doug Bruno =

American basketball player-coach

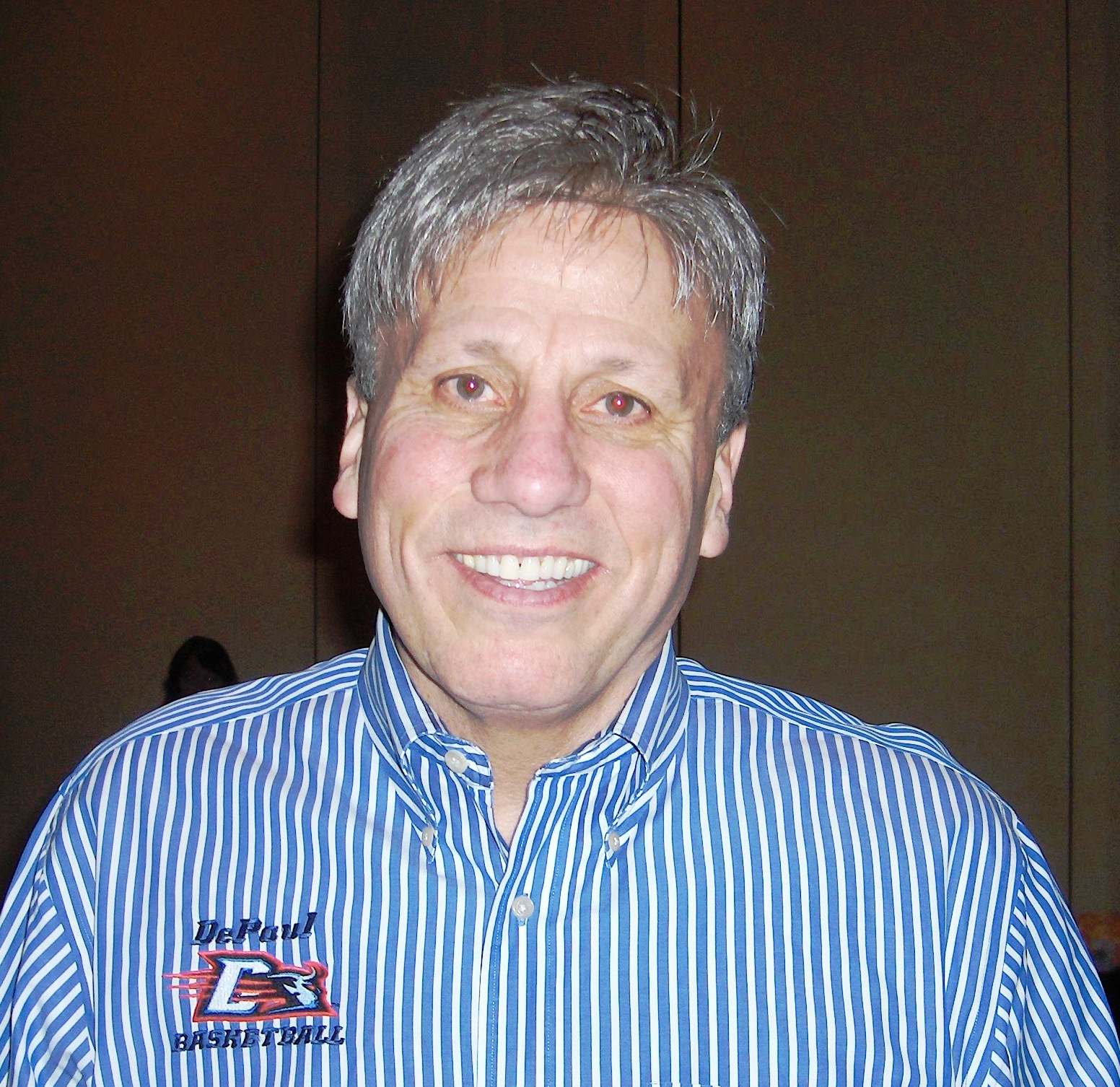
- Bruno at the Indiana Convention Center on April 4, 2011

Current position
- Title: Special Assistant to the Vice President/Director of Athletics for Women's Basketball
- Team: DePaul
- Conference: Big East

Biographical details
- Born: November 7, 1950 (age 75); Chicago, Illinois, U.S.

Playing career
- 1969–1973: DePaul
- Position: Guard

Coaching career (HC unless noted)
- 1973–1974: Parker HS (asst.)
- 1974–1975: St. Vincent DePaul HS
- 1976–1978: DePaul
- 1978–1980: Chicago Hustle
- 1980–1988: Loyola (IL) (men's asst.)
- 1988–2024: DePaul

Head coaching record
- Overall: 786–402 (.662)
- Tournaments: 17–25 (.405)

Accomplishments and honors

Championships
- 5 Big East tournament (2014–2015, 2018–2020); 6 Big East regular season (2014 – 2018, 2020); 2 C-USA regular season (1996, 2005); Great Midwest Tournament (1992); Great Midwest regular season (1992); North Star Tournament (1989); North Star regular Season (1989)

Awards
- C-USA Coach of the Year 2005; Conference USA's Coach of the Decade
- Women's Basketball Hall of Fame
Medal record
Coach for Women's Basketball
United States (assistant coach)
Olympic Games
Gold medal – first place	2012 London	Team
Gold medal – first place	2016 Rio de Janeiro	Team
FIBA World Championship for Women
Gold medal – first place	2010 Czech Republic	Team
United States (head coach)
FIBA Under-19 World Championship
Gold medal – first place	2007 Bratislava	Team
FIBA Americas Under-18 Championship
Gold medal – first place	2006 Colorado Springs	Team

Richard Douglas Bruno (born November 7, 1950) is the Special Assistant to the Vice President/Director of Athletics for Women’s Basketball and the former head coach of the DePaul Blue Demons women's basketball team. In 2016, he completed his 30th season as head coach. Under his tenure, the Blue Demons have qualified for post-season competition play in 24 of his 33 completed seasons, including the last 17 seasons.

In 2007, Bruno completed a two-year term as President of the Women's Basketball Coaches Association, a position to which he was elected by his peers.

== High school and college ==
Born Douglas Bruno in Normal, Illinois. Doug Bruno played high school basketball at Quigley Preparatory Seminary South. Bruno played college basketball at DePaul University under Basketball Hall of Fame coach Ray Meyer, earning a letter three years, and starting two seasons.

== Coaching career ==
=== High school ===
Bruno started his coaching career in 1973–74 at the high school level, first as an assistant coach for the boys' team at Francis Parker High School in Chicago, then as a head coach in 1974–75 for the boys' team at St. Vincent DePaul High School.

=== DePaul ===
Bruno was named the head coach of the DePaul Blue Demons women's basketball program in 1976. In the first season, the team achieved an 11–10 record,. In the second season the team achieved a 16–6 record, the most wins in the program's history.

=== Chicago Hustle ===
Bruno left DePaul to become the head coach of the Chicago Hustle, a women's basketball team in the Women's Professional Basketball League. They were originally going to be called the Hustlers, but that name reminded some of hookers. Bruno suggested changing the name to simply the Hustle. On December 9, 1978, the Chicago Hustle played the Milwaukee Does in what was not just the inaugural game of the Women's Professional Basketball League, but the first professional women's basketball game in the United States. The game was played in the MECCA Arena (now UW–Milwaukee Panther Arena) in Milwaukee, Wisconsin. Bruno was 27 years old, younger than some of his players, trying to keep them calm while waiting to start their first professional game in front of national press services. When an English radio announcer interrupted him with advice, he lessened the tension with a mashup of some famous speeches, invoking the Duke of Wellington and Knute Rockne. He implored his teams, "remember girls, the battle of Dunkirk was won on the playing fields of Eton. Now, go out there and win one for the Gipper."

There were 7,824 people in the stands. Milwaukee scored the first points, but Chicago went on to take the lead. Poor free throw shooting by Milwaukee would prove critical, and Chicago would go on to win the first professional women's basketball game by a score of 92–87.

In their first year, the Hustle tied for the Midwest Division crown. The league lasted three years, but Bruno left the Hustle after his second year. Bruno was involved in what has been called "[t]he WBL's most serious officiating dispute." Bruno thought his point guard was getting roughed up, and had responded by kicking a folding chair in one game, although it was reported that he tossed the folding chair "30 feet across the floor at an official". In a subsequent game, he thought his point guard was fouled with no call, so he went after the referee. Three security guards pulled Bruno off the referee, but not before the fans got involved. The fights included 70 people, requiring a call to the police to restore order. After a delay, the Chicago team won 128–123 in overtime.

=== Loyola Chicago ===
Bruno then left coaching women to become the associate men's head coach at Loyola University Chicago under Gene Sullivan. He spent eight years at Loyola, during which the team had two 20 win seasons, and reached the Sweet Sixteen once, in 1984–85.

=== DePaul ===
Bruno returned to DePaul and women's basketball in 1988, returning to the head coaching position of the Blue Demons. His first season, the team achieved a 23–10 record, tying for first place in the North Star conference, and qualifying for post-season play. The team finished seventh in the WNIT. His team has qualified for post-season play all but three of the seasons since his return to DePaul. The team was a member of the North Star conference until the 1990–91 season, then was a member of the Great Midwest Conference for four years. That conference then merged to become part of Conference USA, where DePaul remained until joining the Big East in 2005.

In his first year as a member of the Big East, Bruno's Blue Demons achieved a 23–7 record, and made it to the Sweet Sixteen of the NCAA Women's Division I Basketball Championship.

DePaul announced in 2009 that the basketball court at McGrath-Phillips Arena will be named the Doug Bruno Court in his honor. The decision was kept a surprise, and announced at the annual Doug Bruno Challenge Dinner. Doug was told the dinner attendance wasn't meeting expectations, and asked if his six sons could help bolster the attendance by showing up and bringing friends.

== USA Basketball ==
=== 2006 USA U18 and U19 National Team ===
Bruno was selected to be the head coach of the USA Women's U18 and U19 teams in 2006 and 2007. The U18 team competed for the FIBA Americas Championship, held in Colorado Springs, Colorado from June 28 – July 2, 2006. The USA team defeated Paraguay, Brazil, Argentina, and Canada to win the Gold Medal, and qualify for the 2007 FIBA U19 World Championship, in Bratislava, Slovakia. The following year, Bruno coached the team to a perfect 9–0 record and a Gold Medal at the U19 World Championship. USA would play a close game against Spain in an early round, winning only by eight points 74–66, but in the medal round rematch, USA defeated Spain easily, 69–46. The USA team faced undefeated Sweden in the championship game, but won easily 99–57.

=== USA Women's National Team ===
Bruno was named to an assistant coaching position for the USA women's national basketball team. The team begins training in 2009 in preparation for the 2010 World Championships. Training camp was held in Washington, D.C., after which the team visited wounded soldiers at the Walter Reed Army Medical Center. Following completion of the training camp, the team will head to Ekaterinburg, Russia, to compete in the 2009 UMMC Ekaterinburg International Invitational. Bruno served as an assistant coach for the USA National Basketball team at the 2010 World Championships. He will continue as an assistant at the 2012 Olympic games.

Bruno was named assistant coach of the USA National team in preparation for competition at the 2010 World Championships and the 2012 Olympic Games in London. Because many team members were still playing in the WNBA until just prior to the event, the team had only one day of practice with the entire team before leaving for Ostrava and Karlovy Vary, Czech Republic. Even with limited practice, the team managed to win their first game against Greece by 26 points. The team continued to dominate with victory margins exceeding 20 points in the first five games. Several players shared scoring honors, with Swin Cash, Angel McCoughtry, Maya Moore, Diana Taurasi, Lindsay Whalen, and Sylvia Fowles all ending as high scorer in the first few games. The sixth game was against undefeated Australia—the USA jumped out to a 24-point lead, but the Australian team cut the lead back to single digits late in the game. The USA prevailed 83–75. The USA won their next two games by over thirty points, then faced the host team, the Czech Republic, in the championship game. The USA team had only a five-point lead at halftime, which was cut to three points, but the Czechs never got closer, and went on to win the championship and gold medal.

Bruno was an assistant coach for the USA women's national basketball team at the 2016 Olympic Games in Rio de Janeiro.

== WBCA ==
Bruno served as a member of the Board of Directors of the Women's Basketball Coaches Association in 2003 and 2004. Bruno was then elected President of the organization for a two-year team, starting September 1, 2005. His term officially ended in 2007, but he acted as President at the 2009 convention. The organization has a President and a past President—if the President is the coach of a team in the Final Four (occurring the same time as the annual convention), the Past President presides. However, in 2009, both Past President Sherri Coale of Oklahoma, and President Geno Auriemma of Connecticut had teams in the Final Four, so Bruno stepped in as acting President at the annual convention.

== Awards and honors ==
- 2008—Carol Eckman Award

== Head coaching record (college) ==
Record table
Season	Team	Overall	Conference	Standing	Postseason
DePaul (Independent) (1976–1978)
1976–77	DePaul	11–10			
1977–78	DePaul	16–6			
DePaul:		27–16 (.628)			
DePaul (North Star Conference) (1988–1991)
1988–89	DePaul	23–10	12–2	T–1st	
1989–90	DePaul	22–10	10–2	2nd	NCAA Second Round
1990–91	DePaul	19–12	11–3	3rd	NCAA First Round
DePaul:		64–32 (.667)	33–7 (.825)		
DePaul (Great Midwest Conference) (1991–1995)
1991–92	DePaul	21–10	10–2	T–1st	NCAA Second Round
1992–93	DePaul	20–9	8–2	2nd	NCAA First Round
1993–94	DePaul	10–20	5–7	4th	
1994–95	DePaul	20–9	9–3	T–2nd	NCAA First Round
DePaul:		71–48 (.597)	32–14 (.696)		
DePaul (Conference USA) (1995–2005)
1995–96	DePaul	21–10	13–1	1st	NCAA Second Round
1996–97	DePaul	20–9	10–4	T–4th	NCAA First Round
1997–98	DePaul	11–18	5–11	T–7th	
1998–99	DePaul	12–15	7–9	8th	
1999–00	DePaul	18–12	10–6	T–4th	
2000–01	DePaul	18–14	8–8	8th	
2001–02	DePaul	15–14	8–6	4th	
2002–03	DePaul	22–10	10–4	3rd	NCAA First Round
2003–04	DePaul	23–7	10–4	4th	NCAA Second Round
2004–05	DePaul	26–5	13–1	1st	NCAA Second Round
DePaul:		186–114 (.620)	94–54 (.635)		
DePaul (Big East) (2005–2013)
2005–06	DePaul	27–7	11–5	T–3rd	NCAA Sweet Sixteen
2006–07	DePaul	19–13	8–8	10th	NCAA First Round
2007–08	DePaul	20–12	8–8	T–8th	NCAA First Round
2008–09	DePaul	23–10	10–6	T–4th	NCAA First Round
2009–10	DePaul	21–12	9–7	T–6th	NCAA First Round
2010–11	DePaul	29–7	13–3	T–2nd	NCAA Sweet Sixteen
2011–12	DePaul	23–11	9–7	8th	NCAA Second Round
2012–13	DePaul	21–12	9–7	T–6th	NCAA First Round
DePaul Blue Demons (Big East) (2013–2025)
2013–14	DePaul	29–7	15–3	1st	NCAA Sweet Sixteen
2014–15	DePaul	27–8	15–3	T–1st	NCAA Second Round
2015–16	DePaul	27–9	16–2	1st	NCAA Sweet Sixteen
2016–17	DePaul	27–8	16–2	T–1st	NCAA Second Round
2017–18	DePaul	27–8	15–3	T–1st	NCAA Second Round
2018–19	DePaul	26–5	14–4	2nd	NCAA First Round
2019–20	DePaul	28–5	15–3	1st	NCAA Tournament cancelled due to COVID-19
2020–21	DePaul	14–10	11–5	4th	WNIT First Round
2021–22	DePaul	22–11	14–6	4th	NCAA First Four
2022–23	DePaul	16–17	8–12	8th	
2023–24	DePaul	12–20	4–14	10th	
DePaul:		438–184 (.704)	218–108 (.669)		
Total:		786–402 (.662)			
National champion Postseason invitational champion Conference regular season champion Conference regular season and conference tournament champion Division regular season champion Division regular season and conference tournament champion Conference tournament champion

== See also ==
- List of college women's basketball career coaching wins leaders
