= Rosie Walker =

WNBA basketball player

Personal information
- Born: 1957 (age 68–69)
- Listed height: 6 ft 1 in (1.85 m)
- Listed weight: 190 lb (86 kg)

Career information
- High school: Emerson (Emerson, Arkansas)
- College: Panola College (1976–1978); Stephen F. Austin (1978–1980)
- Position: Center

Career history
- 1980–1981: Nebraska Wranglers

Career highlights
- WBL champion (1981); WBL MVP (1981); 2× Kodak All-American (1979, 1980); 2× NJCAA champion (1977, 1978); NJCAA Tournament MVP (1978); 2× NJCAA All-American (1977, 1978)
- Stats at Basketball Reference
- Women's Basketball Hall of Fame
Medals
Women's basketball
Representing the United States
World Championship
Gold medal – first place	1979 South Korea
Pan American Games
Silver medal – second place	1979 Puerto Rico

Rosie Walker (born 1957) is an American former basketball player. She played college basketball for Stephen F. Austin State University. After college, she was drafted by the Nebraska Wranglers in the 1980 Women's Professional Basketball League (WBL) draft and led the team to the 1981 championship and was named the league's MVP after averaging 26.0 points and 14.4 rebounds per game.

Walker was inducted into the Women's Basketball Hall of Fame in 2001.
