= DePaul Blue Demons women's basketball =

DePaul Blue Demons
2026–27 DePaul Blue Demons women's basketball team
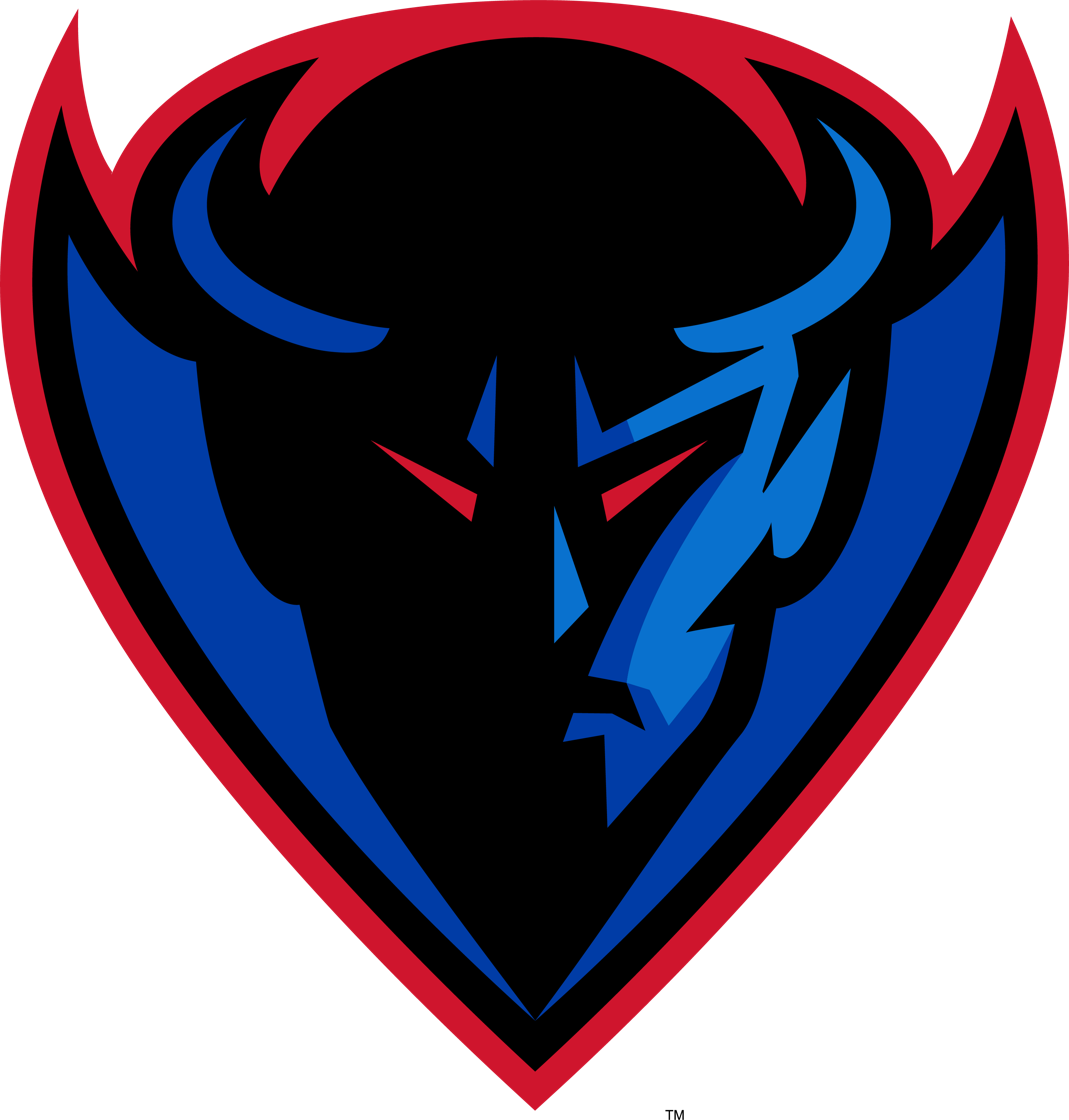
- University: DePaul University
- Head coach: Jill Pizzotti (2nd season)
- Location: Chicago, Illinois
- Arena: Wintrust Arena (capacity: 10,387)
- Conference: Big East
- Nickname: Blue Demons
- Colors: Royal blue and scarlet

NCAA Division I tournament Sweet Sixteen
- 2006, 2011, 2014, 2016

NCAA Division I tournament appearances
- 1990, 1991, 1992, 1993, 1995, 1996, 1997, 2003, 2004, 2005, 2006, 2007, 2008, 2009, 2010, 2011, 2012, 2013, 2014, 2015, 2016, 2017, 2018, 2019, 2022

Conference tournament champions
- Big East Conference; 2014, 2015, 2018, 2019, 2020

Conference regular-season champions
- North Star Conference; 1987, 1988, 1989 Great Midwest Conference; 1992 Conference USA; 1996, 2005 Big East Conference; 2014, 2015, 2016, 2017, 2018, 2020

NWIT champions
- 1988

The DePaul Blue Demons women's basketball program is the NCAA Division I intercollegiate women's basketball program of DePaul University in Chicago, Illinois. The team competes in the Big East Conference.

The Blue Demons play home games at Wintrust Arena at the McCormick Place convention center on Chicago's Near South Side. While DePaul is among the ranks for regular appearances in the NCAA tournament with 25, they have the most appearances in the tournament without reaching the Final Four.

== History ==
The DePaul women's basketball team began competing in the AIAW in 1974–1975 under coach Debbie Miller and had their first winning season two seasons later, obtaining an 11–10 record under then coach Doug Bruno.

DePaul is one of the seven core schools that left the original Big East Conference in 2013 to form the current Big East Conference. Before joining the original Big East in 2005, the Blue Demons previously competed in Conference USA, the Great Midwest Conference, and the North Star Conference.

After 39 seasons as head coach, Doug Bruno announced that he was stepping down on March 28, 2025, after missing nearly the entire 2024–25 season. Beginning May 1, Bruno will become DePaul's Special Assistant to the Vice President/Director of Athletics for Women's Basketball. Associate head coach Jill Pizzotti finished the season and was officially promoted to full-time status on 3 April 2025. On February 10, 2026, DePaul earned the program's 1,000th victory with a 72–68 win over St. John's, becoming one of 86 Division I programs to reach the milestone and the second current Big East member to do so, after UConn. Earlier that season, a crowd of 9,526 for the November 17, 2025, Field Trip Day game against Northwestern set a program attendance record.

== Year by year results ==
Season	Team	Overall	Conference	Standing	Postseason	Coaches' poll	AP poll
Debbie Miller (Independent) (1974–1976)
1974–75	Debbie Miller	3–8	–		IAIAW		
1975–76	Debbie Miller	7–12	–		IAIAW		
Debbie Miller:		10–20	–				
Doug Bruno (Independent) (1977–1979)
1976–77	Doug Bruno	11–10	–				
1977–78	Doug Bruno	16–6	–		IAIAW		
Doug Bruno:		27–16	–				
John Lawler (Independent) (1978–1980)
1978–79	John Lawler	23–4	–		IAIAW		
1979–80	John Lawler	11–13	–		AIAW Midwest		
:		34–17	–				
Ron Feiereisel (Independent, North Star) (1980–1984)
1980–81	Ron Feiereisel	18–14	–		AIAW Midwest		
1981–82	Ron Feiereisel	18–12	–		NWIT Sixth Place		
1982–83	Ron Feiereisel	13–15	–				
North Star Conference
1983–84	Ron Feiereisel	12–16	5–5	3rd			
Ron Feiereisel:		61–57	5–5				
Jim Izard (North Star) (1984–1988)
1984–85	Jim Izard	19–9	7–7	5th			
1985–86	Jim Izard	21–7	8–6	4th			
1986–87	Jim Izard	23–8	5–1	1st	NWIT Seventh Place		
1987–88	Jim Izard	27–4	9–1	1st	NWIT Champions	22	
Jim Izard:		90–28	29–15				
Doug Bruno (North Star, Great Midwest, Conference USA, Big East (original), Big East (current)) (1988–2025)
1988–89	Doug Bruno	23–10	12–2	T-1st	NWIT Sixth Place		
1989–90	Doug Bruno	22–10	10–2	2nd	NCAA Second Round (Play-In)		
1990–91	Doug Bruno	19–12	11–3	3rd	NCAA First Round		
Great Midwest Conference
1991–92	Doug Bruno	21–10	8–2	1st (GM)	NCAA Second Round (Bye)		
1992–93	Doug Bruno	20–9	8–2	2nd	NCAA First Round		
1993–94	Doug Bruno	10–20	5–7	4th			
1994–95	Doug Bruno	20–9	9–3	2nd	NCAA First Round		
Conference USA
1995–96	Doug Bruno	21–10	13–1	1st (CUSA Blue)	NCAA Second Round	23	
1996–97	Doug Bruno	20–9	10–4	2nd (CUSA Blue)	NCAA First Round		
1997–98	Doug Bruno	11–18	5–11	6th (American)			
1998–99	Doug Bruno	12–15	7–9	4th (American)			
1999–2000	Doug Bruno	18–12	10–6	2nd (American)	WNIT Sixteen		
2000–01	Doug Bruno	18–14	8–8	4th (American)	WNIT Sixteen		
2001–02	Doug Bruno	15–14	8–6	4th			
2002–03	Doug Bruno	22–10	10–4	3rd	NCAA First Round		
2003–04	Doug Bruno	23–7	10–4	4th	NCAA Second Round	25	
2004–05	Doug Bruno	26–5	13–1	1st	NCAA Second Round	20	17
Big East Conference (1979–2013)
2005–06	Doug Bruno	27–7	11–5	3rd	NCAA Sweet Sixteen	15	13
2006–07	Doug Bruno	19–13	8–8	10th	NCAA First Round		
2007–08	Doug Bruno	20–12	8–8	9th	NCAA First Round		
2008–09	Doug Bruno	23–10	10–6	6th	NCAA First Round		
2009–10	Doug Bruno	21–12	9–7	7th	NCAA First Round		
2010–11	Doug Bruno	29–7	13–3	2nd	NCAA Sweet Sixteen	10	9
2011–12	Doug Bruno	23–11	9–7	8th	NCAA Second Round	24	
2012–13	Doug Bruno	21–12	9–7	7th	NCAA First Round		
Big East Conference
2013–14	Doug Bruno	27–6	15–3	1st	NCAA Sweet Sixteen	23	22
2014–15	Doug Bruno	27–8	15–3	2nd	NCAA Second round		
2015–16	Doug Bruno	27–9	16–2	1st	NCAA Sweet Sixteen	20	21
2016–17	Doug Bruno	27–8	16–2	1st	NCAA Second round	19	18
2017–18	Doug Bruno	27–8	15–3	2nd	NCAA Second round		23
2018–19	Doug Bruno	26–8	14–4	2nd	NCAA First round	24	25
2019–20	Doug Bruno	28–5	15–3	1st		15	14
2020–21	Doug Bruno	14–10	11–5	4th	WNIT First round		
2021–22	Doug Bruno	22–11	14–6	4th	NCAA First four		
2022–23	Doug Bruno	16–17	8–12	7th			
2023–24	Doug Bruno	12–20	4–14	10th			
Doug Bruno:		786–402	379–183				
Jill Pizzotti (Big East) (2024–2026)
2024–25	Jill Pizzotti	13–19	8–10	6th			
2025–26	Jill Pizzotti	8–24	5–15	10th			
Jill Pizzotti:		21–43	13–25				
Total:		913–503					
National champion Postseason invitational champion Conference regular season champion Conference regular season and conference tournament champion Division regular season champion Division regular season and conference tournament champion Conference tournament champion

== NCAA tournament results ==
The Blue Demons have appeared in the NCAA Division I women's basketball tournament 25 times. Their combined record is 17–25.

Year	Seed	Round	Opponent	Result
1990	#8	Round of 48; Round of 32	Western Kentucky; Washington	W 73–63; L 77–68
1991	#12	Round of 48	Oklahoma State	L 80–81
1992	#11	Round of 48; Round of 32	Arizona State; Penn State	W 67–65; L 54–77
1993	#11	Round of 48	Louisiana Tech	L 59–70
1995	#13	Round of 64	George Washington	L 79–87
1996	#7	Round of 64; Round of 32	Southern Methodist; Iowa	W 96–82; L 71–72
1997	#12	Round of 64	Duke	L 56–70
2003	#9	Round of 64	Utah	L 64–73
2004	#9	Round of 64; Round of 32	George Washington; Tennessee	W 83–46; L 59–79
2005	#5	Round of 64; Round of 32	Virginia Tech; Liberty	W 79–78; L 79–88
2006	#4	Round of 64; Round of 32; Sweet Sixteen	Liberty; Tulsa; LSU	W 68–43; W 71–67; L 56–66
2007	#10	Round of 64	Georgia Tech	L 54–55
2008	#10	Round of 64	Marist	L 57–76
2009	#7	Round of 64	San Diego State	L 43–68
2010	#11	Round of 64	Vanderbilt	L 76–83 (OT)
2011	#3	Round of 64; Round of 32; Sweet Sixteen	Navy; Penn State; Duke	W 56–43; W 75–53; L 63–70
2012	#7	Round of 64; Round of 32	Brigham Young; Tennessee	W 59–55; L 48–63
2013	#10	Round of 64	Oklahoma State	L 56–73
2014	#7	Round of 64; Round of 32; Sweet Sixteen	Oklahoma; Duke; Texas A&M	W 104–100; W 74–65; L 65–84
2015	#9	Round of 64; Round of 32	Minnesota; Notre Dame	W 79–72; L 67–79
2016	#6	Round of 64; Round of 32; Sweet Sixteen	James Madison; Louisville; Oregon State	W 97–67; W 73–72; L 71–83
2017	#7	Round of 64; Round of 32	Northern Iowa; Mississippi State	W 88–67; L 71–92
2018	#5	Round of 64; Round of 32	Oklahoma; Texas A&M	W 90–79; L 80–81
2019	#6	Round of 64	Missouri State	L 78–89
2022	#11	First Four	Dayton	L 57–88

=== WNIT Championships ===
DePaul has won one National Women's Invitational Tournament (NWIT) championship before the tournament folded in 1996 to become the WNIT.

Year	Coach	Record	Result
1987-88	Jim Izard	27–4	DePaul 83 Purdue Boilermakers 55
Total NWIT/WNIT championships:	1		

== Notable players and coaches ==
=== National awards ===
- Tamika Catchings Award (USBWA Freshman of the Year)

Aneesah Morrow – 2022

- WBCA Freshman of the Year

Aneesah Morrow – 2022

- Carol Eckman Award

Doug Bruno – 2008

=== Conference awards ===
- Big East Conference Player of the Year

Brittany Hrynko – 2015
Chanise Jenkins – 2016
Brooke Schulte – 2017

- Big East Conference Freshman of the Year

Aneesah Morrow – 2022

- Big East Conference Defensive Player of the Year

Jacqui Grant – 2017
Chante Stonewall – 2020

- Big East Conference Sixth Player of the Year

China Threatt – 2009
Taylor Pikes – 2011
Tanita Allen – 2017

- Big East Conference Coach of the Year

Doug Bruno – 2014, 2016, 2017

- Conference USA Player of the Year

Kim Williams – 1996

- Conference USA Freshman of the Year

Khara Smith – 2003
Allie Quigley – 2005

- Conference USA Sixth Player of the Year

Kris Booker – 1996

- Conference USA Coach of the Year

Doug Bruno – 2005

- Conference USA All-Decade Team (Note: "Decade" is defined as the first decade of Conference USA's existence, starting with the 1995–96 season and ending with the 2004–05 season.)

Khara Smith

- Conference USA Coach of the Decade

Doug Bruno

- Great Midwest Conference Player of the Year

Tammy Williams – 1993
Latasha Byears – 1995

- Great Midwest Conference Coach of the Year

Doug Bruno – 1995

- North Star Conference Player of the Year

Sally Anderson – 1987
Diana Vines – 1988, 1989

- North Star Conference Coach of the Year

Jim Izard – 1987

=== Retired numbers ===
DePaul has retired four jersey numbers.

DePaul Blue Demons retired numbers
No.	Player	Pos.	Career	Year Retired
40	Diana Vines	Forward	1985-89	2024

== Roster ==
2026–27 DePaul Blue Demons women's basketball team
Players
Coaches

Pos.	#	Name	Height	Year	Previous school	Hometown
G	0	Gina Davorija	6 ft 1 in (1.85 m)	So	Glenbrook South	Glenview, IL
F	3	Louis Volker	5 ft 11 in (1.8 m)	GS	Paul VI; George Mason	Purcellville, VA
G	7	Devin Hagemann	5 ft 6 in (1.68 m)	Jr	Detroit Edison	Detroit, MI
G	8	Mikaia Litza	5 ft 8 in (1.73 m)	Fr	Wauwatosa East	Wauwatosa, WI
G	15	Nyah Lowery	6 ft 0 in (1.83 m)	Sr	St. Mary's; Pepperdine	Sacramento, CA
F	22	Kaliyah Dillard	6 ft 0 in (1.83 m)	Sr	Centennial; San Jose State	Las Vegas, NV
G	24	Ally Timm	5 ft 10 in (1.78 m)	Jr	Divine Savoir Holy Angels	Menomonee Falls, WI
G	25	Kate Clarke	6 ft 1 in (1.85 m)	GS	Carmel	Carmel, IN
F	30	Zoey Ward	6 ft 0 in (1.83 m)	Sr	Concord; Iona	Gastonia, NC
F	33	Doyinsola Lijirin	6 ft 3 in (1.91 m)	Sr	Topfield Secondary; Wagner	Ondo State, Nigeria
G	34	Emily Bojan	5 ft 11 in (1.8 m)	GS	Marist; Wisconsin	Chicago, IL

Head coach

- Jill Pizzotti (Southeast Missouri State)

Assistant coach(es)

- Ty Evans (UW–Whitewater)
- Bradley Bruno (DePaul)
- Ashton Millender (DePaul)
- Kathleen Doyle (Iowa)
- Jasmyne Fogle (Franklin Pierce)

Legend

- (C) Team captain
- (S) Suspended
- (I) Ineligible
- (W) Walk-on
- Injured
- Current redshirt

Roster
Last update: September 21, 2026
