= Carol Blazejowski =

American basketball player (born 1956)

Personal information
- Born: September 29, 1956 (age 70) Elizabeth, New Jersey, U.S.
- Listed height: 5 ft 10 in (1.78 m)

Career information
- High school: Cranford (Cranford, New Jersey)
- College: Montclair State (1974–1978)
- Position: Forward
- Number: 12, 15

Career history
- 1978–1980: Allentown Crestettes
- 1980–1981: New Jersey Gems

Career highlights
- As player: WBL scoring leader (1981); USA Basketball Female Athlete of the Year (1980); Wade Trophy (1978); 3x Kodak All-American (1976–1978)
- Stats at Basketball Reference
- Basketball Hall of Fame
- Women's Basketball Hall of Fame
Medals
Women's Basketball
Representing United States
Jones Cup
Gold medal – first place	1979 Taipei	Team competition
Pan American
Silver medal – second place	1979 San Juan	Team competition
World University Games
Gold medal – first place	1977 Sofia	Team competition
Gold medal – first place	1979 Mexico City	Team competition
FIBA World Championship for Women
Gold medal – first place	1979 Seoul	Team competition

Carol Ann Blazejowski (born September 29, 1956) is an American former basketball player and the former president and general manager of the New York Liberty of the Women's National Basketball Association (WNBA). Blazejowski was inducted in the inaugural class at the Women's Basketball Hall of Fame in 1999.

== Family ==
Born in Elizabeth, New Jersey, Blazejowski is the daughter of Leon and Grace (John) Blazejowski. She resides with her family in Nutley, New Jersey. She is an out lesbian.

== College and amateur career ==
Using a jump shot patterned after what she saw in televised professional games, Blazejowski became one of the greatest scorers in the history of women's basketball, although she didn't begin serious competition until her senior year at Cranford High School in Cranford, New Jersey.

At Montclair State College in Montclair, New Jersey, the 5-foot-10 (1.78 m) forward was a three-time All-American, from 1976 through 1978. Blazejowski won the inaugural Wade Trophy as the nation's finest collegiate woman player in 1978. She led the nation in scoring with 33.5 points per game in 1976/77 and 38.6 points per game in 1977/78. Blazejowski scored 40 or more points in each of her last three games, including the semifinal loss to eventual champion UCLA. Sports Illustrated would call Blazejowski, "the most relentlessly exciting performer in the history of women's basketball". She set a Madison Square Garden record for either sex with 52 points in a 1977 game against Queens College. Similar to all-time men's collegiate scoring record holder, Pete Maravich, "The Blaze" played during an era without the three-point shot.

After finishing her college career, Blazejowski played two seasons of AAU basketball with the Allentown, Pennsylvania, Crestettes. She often scored over 40 points in a game, and led the team to the semifinals both years, and once to a second-place finish. The leading scorer on the national team that won the 1979 world championship, she was chosen for the 1980 U.S. Olympic team, but her hopes for a gold medal were crushed after the U.S. boycott of the 1980 Summer Olympics.

=== Montclair State College statistics ===
Legend
GP	Games played	GS	Games started	MPG	Minutes per game
FG%	Field goal percentage	3P%	3-point field goal percentage	FT%	Free throw percentage
RPG	Rebounds per game	APG	Assists per game	SPG	Steals per game
BPG	Blocks per game	PPG	Points per game	**Bold**	Career high

College career statistics
Year	Team	GP	Points	FG%	FT%	RPG	APG	PPG
1975	Montclair State College	17	333	48.4%	70.4%	**11.0**	1.7	19.6
1976	Montclair State College	25	712	55.2%	77.3%	10.2	2.8	28.5
1977	Montclair State College	27	919	56.5%	79.6%	10.1	2.6	34.0
1978	Montclair State College	**32**	**1235**	**56.9%**	**83.7%**	9.9	**3.0**	**38.6**
Career		101	3199	55.4%	79.5%	10.2	2.6	31.7

== USA Basketball ==
Only an alternate on the 1976 Olympic team, Blazejowski led the 1977 World University Games team in scoring and had 38 points in a losing effort against the Soviet Union.

Blazejowski traveled to San Juan, Puerto Rico to take part in the 1979 Pan American Games. The USA team won their first five games to advance to the gold medal game, but faced Cuba in the final, and lost 91–86 to take the silver medal. Blazejowski scored 10.2 points per game.

Blazejowski was named to the team representing the US at the 1979 World University Games, held in Mexico City, Mexico. The USA team won all seven games to take the gold medal. The USA team played and beat Cuba twice, the team that had defeated them at the Pan Am games. Blazejowski was the leading scorer for the USA team, with 18.4 points per game.

The National team representing the USA had not won a World Championship since 1957. In 1979, the World Championships were held in Seoul, South Korea. Blazejowski was one of the twelve player squad. In the opening game against host South Korea, the USA team was upset, despite 23 points from Blazejowski. The USA team then faced Italy, and had a close call, winning but just two points 66–64. In the final game, the USA faced Canada, who had not lost. With the USA 4–1 record, the USA did not simply need to win, but need to win by more than 13 points to secure the gold. The USA ended up winning the game by 16 points, thus securing the gold with only three points to spare. Blazejowski was the leading scorer for the USA team with 18.7 points per game.

Blazejowski was named to the team representing the US at the William Jones Cup competition in Taipei, Taiwan. The USA team won all six games en route to the gold medal. Blazejowski was named to the Jones Cup All-Tournament Team.

Blazejowski was named to the team scheduled to represent the US at the 1980 Olympics, but the USA chose not to participate in the Olympics that year.

== Professional playing career ==
In 1980, Blazejowski became the highest-paid player in the Women's Pro Basketball League, signing a three-year contract for a reported $150,000 with the New Jersey Gems. However, the league folded after her first season, effectively ending her playing career.

== Executive career ==
After serving six years working in the front office of the National Basketball Association, Blazejowski was named vice president and general manager of the WNBA's New York Liberty on January 7, 1997. On February 15, 2008, it was announced that Blazejowski was promoted to president of the New York Liberty. On September 20, 2010, the New York Liberty announced her contract would not be extended. On February 22, 2011, it was announced that Blazejowski was hired as Associate Vice President for University Advancement at Montclair State University, rejoining her alma mater.

== Honors and cultural references ==
In 1994, Blazejowski was enshrined in the Basketball Hall of Fame in Springfield, Massachusetts, as well as, the National Polish American Sports Hall of Fame. In 1999, she was inducted into the inaugural class of the Women's Basketball Hall of Fame, located in Knoxville, Tennessee.

Blazejowski is a hidden player in NBA Jam Tournament Edition, accessible via a cheat code. In the game, she possesses impressive three-point shooting abilities. She is also a hidden player in NBA Jam Extreme.

In 2017, Blazejowski was inducted into the New Jersey Hall of Fame.

The basketball courts at Lincoln Park in Cranford, New Jersey were dedicated in her honor in 2017.
