= Marie Kocurek =

American basketball player

Personal information
- Born: c.1956
- Listed height: 6 ft 1 in (1.85 m)

Career information
- High school: Tuloso-Midway (Corpus Christi, Texas)
- College: Wayland Baptist (1974–1978)
- WBL draft: 1978: 3rd round
- Drafted by: Houston Angels
- Position: Center

Career history
- 1978–1981: Minnesota Fillies
- 1981: Nebraska Wranglers

Career highlights
- WBL champion (1981); 2× WBL All-Pro team (1979, 1980); 3× WBL All-Star (1979–1981)
- Stats at Basketball Reference

Marie Kocurek (born c.1956) is an American former basketball player. After playing college basketball for Wayland Baptist University, she played three seasons in the Women's Professional Basketball League. After playing her first two and a half season with the Minnesota Fillies, she was traded to the Nebraska Wranglers in 1981 after publicly complain about the Fillies owing her 9,000 dollars in back pay. With the Wranglers, she won the WBL championship in 1981.
