= Milwaukee Does =

- Division: Midwest (1978–1980)
- League: Women's Professional Basketball League
- Founded: 1978
- Folded: 1980
- History: Milwaukee Does; 1978–1980
- Arena: MECCA Arena (1978–1980)
- Location: Milwaukee, WI
- Team colors: Yellow-green, Purple, white
- Head coach: Candace Klinzing (1978); Dylan Huggins (1978–1979); Larry Costello (1979–1980); Julia Yeater (1980)
- Ownership: Robert Peters (1978–1979); Herbert Schoeherr (1979–1980); Dr. Arthur Howell (1980)
- Championships: 0
- Conference titles: 0
- Division titles: 0

The Milwaukee Does were an American professional basketball team that played in the Women's Professional Basketball League. Based in Milwaukee, Wisconsin, their name was a play on that of the NBA Milwaukee Bucks. The Does played in the first two of the WPBL's three seasons, 1978–1979 and 1979–1980, before disbanding. The team played its home games at the Milwaukee Arena and were coached for part of the 1979–1980 season by Larry Costello, who had coached the Bucks from their inception, including an NBA championship in 1971.

== History ==
The league played its first game on December 9, 1978, between the hometown Does and the Chicago Hustle at the Milwaukee Arena, with the league's inaugural game attracting four minutes of coverage in the previous night's CBS Evening News with Walter Cronkite. Milwaukee mayor Henry Maier issued a proclamation likening this first game to the first professional football game, played in Latrobe, Pennsylvania, and the first pro baseball game, played in Cincinnati. The opening tip off was between Lynda Gehrke of Milwaukee and Sue Digitale of Chicago, who won the toss. Joanne Smith scored the league's first basket on a perimeter jump shot and an assist from Brenda Dennis, with the game ball presumably earning a place of honor in the Smithsonian Institution, as surmised by the Chicago Tribune. Milwaukee had trailed for most of the game, behind 13 points one minute into the fourth quarter, but defensive pressure by the Does led to a series of turnovers and Milwaukee tied the score at 81 with 5:28 left in the game. The Hustle's offense heated up in the last few minutes and held on for a 92–87 win in the league's first game. Kathy DeBoer and Joanne Smith led the Does with 22 points each, though Debra Waddy-Rossow of the Hustle lead all scorers with 30 points.

The team was rather unsuccessful on the court during its two seasons in the league. The team finished the 1978–79 season with a record of 11 wins and 23 losses, placing them in fourth and last place in the Midwest Division. In the Midwestern Division for the 1979–80 season, the Does finished with a record of 11 wins and 24 losses. Their coach for the 1979–80 season was Larry Costello, who had been the coach of the Milwaukee Bucks for eight seasons, starting in April 1968, and had coached the team to four division titles and an NBA championship in the 1970–71 season. Saying that he hadn't been paid any of his $45,000 salary since December, Costello left the team on February 6, 1980, and was replaced by Julia Yeater, the team's assistant coach, on an interim basis.

== Legacy ==
In 2024, amid rumors that the Milwaukee Bucks ownership group would submit a bid for a WNBA expansion team, the Milwaukee Journal Sentinel polled its readers on their preferred name for the hypothetical team. 74 of 177 respondents chose "Does", the highest percentage of any name. In February of 2025, it was reported that the ownership group did not, in fact, submit an expansion bid.
