= Althea Gwyn =

American basketball player

Personal information
- Born: May 19, 1956 (age 70)

Career information
- High school: Amityville Memorial High School (Long Island, New York)
- College: Queens College

Career highlights
- Kodak All-American (1978)
- Stats at Basketball Reference

Althea Regina Gwyn (May 19, 1956 – January 9, 2022) was an American professional basketball player who was one of the first players in the Women's Professional Basketball League (WBL).

== Early life and education ==
Gwyn started her basketball career at Amityville Memorial High School on Long Island. She went on to play at Queens College, playing on February 22, 1975, in the first women's college basketball game to ever be held at Madison Square Garden. She achieved All-American status in 1978 and was a leading rebounder while at Queens College.

Gwyn played for the USA Women's Team in the 1977 World University Games, under her Queens College coach Lucille Kyvallos.

== Career ==
After a brief stint playing amateur basketball in Belgium, Gwyn returned to the United States to play for the New York Stars, a team in the WBL. She chose the WBL over the chance to play for the 1980 Olympic Team. Gwyn later played for the league's New England Gulls.

Gwyn went on to be inducted into the Queens College Athletics Hall of Fame in 2013, and was named a Trailblazer of basketball by the Women's Basketball Hall of Fame in 2018.

After retiring from professional sports, Gwyn worked for the fire department of Fayetteville, North Carolina.
