= Chicago Hustle =

Basketball team in Chicago, Illinois, US

- Division: Midwest (1978–1980); Central (1980–1981)
- League: Women's Professional Basketball League
- Founded: 1978
- Folded: 1981
- History: Chicago Hustle; 1978–1981
- Arena: Alumni Hall (1978-1981)
- Location: Chicago, IL
- Team colors: Red, sky blue, white
- Head coach: Doug Bruno (1978–1980); Bill Gleason (1980–1981)
- Championships: 0
- Conference titles: 0
- Division titles: 1 (1979)

The Chicago Hustle was a team in the Women's Professional Basketball League (WBL) from 1978 to 1981. The team's colors were red and blue.

== History ==
The Hustle played in all three WBL seasons and led the league in attendance each year. The WBL's inaugural game was played on Dec. 9, 1978 in Milwaukee, with the Hustle defeating the Milwaukee Does 92-87 before a crowd of 7,824.

In their first season, the Hustle tied the Iowa Cornets for the Midwest Division title, but Iowa had home-court advantage for the playoffs and won the series 2 games to 1. Rita Easterling was the WBL's Most Valuable Player that first year and led the league in assists. Debbie Waddy-Rossow (cousin of Los Angeles Rams wide receiver Billy Waddy) was the league's leading scorer. Easterling was voted MVP of the league's first All-Star Game in 1979, which was played at Madison Square Garden.

In their second year, the Hustle missed the playoffs. Coach Doug Bruno left to become an assistant to Gene Sullivan for Loyola University of Chicago's men's team and is now the DePaul women's team coach.

In the third and final season, the Hustle added Inge Nissen from Old Dominion University and veteran Donna Geils (now Orender), who from 2005 to 2010 served as president of the WNBA. The team's play-by-play announcer for all three seasons was Les Grobstein, who later became the radio voice of the WNBA's Chicago Sky before his passing on January 16, 2022.

== End of WBL ==
The WBL disbanded in 1981 because of financial problems throughout the league, mostly due to owners who did not pay their bills and who bounced several payroll checks to players and other employees. In 1981, the Minnesota Fillies players who were promised paychecks by Commissioner Sherwin Fischer, only to have him not follow through, walked off the court in Chicago ten minutes.
