= 1980–81 WBL season =

3rd WBL season

1980–801 WBL season
- League: Women's Professional Basketball League
- Sport: Basketball
- Duration: 1980 – 1981
- Teams: 9

Draft
- Top draft pick: Nancy Lieberman
- Picked by: Dallas Diamonds

Regular season
- Top seed: Nebraska Wranglers
- Season MVP: Rosie Walker (Nebraska Wranglers)
- Top scorer: Carol Blazejowski (New Jersey Gems

Playoffs

Finals
- Champions: Nebraska Wranglers
- Runners-up: Dallas Diamonds

WBL seasons
- ← 1979–80

The 1980–81 WBL season was the 3rd and final season of the Women's Professional Basketball League. The season ended with the Nebraska Wranglers winning the WBL Championship, beating the Dallas Diamonds 3 games to 2 in the WBL Finals.

The league was divided into two divisions, with the Dallas Diamonds, New Jersey Gems, New Orleans Pride, San Francisco Pioneers and the New England Gulls in the Coastal Division and the Nebraska Wranglers, Chicago Hustle, St. Louis Streak and the Minnesota Fillies in the Central.

Prior to the season, Tampa Bay Sun was announced as a planned expansion team. However, before the start of the season the franchise was sold to business men from Boston and rebranded as the New England Gulls. Struggling financially, the Gulls where disqualified after 12 games in January 1981 after refusing to play a game on January 15 and subsequently folded.

Rosie Walker of the Nebraska Wranglers was named the league's MVP while Greg Williams and Michael Stavers of the Dallas Diamonds where named the Coach of the Year and the Owner of the Year.

== Notable occurrences ==
- On June 16, 1980, Nancy Lieberman was selected with the first pick in the 1980 WBL draft.
- After sitting out the previous two seasons to keep her amateur status, Carol Blazejowski finally joined the league following the United States boycott of the 1980 Olympics, signing with the team that drafted her in 1978, the New Jersey Gems. She went on to lead the league in scoring, averaging 29.6 points per game.
- On February 7, 1981, Connie Kunzmann of the Nebraska Wranglers went missing. Three days later, Lance Tibke, at the urging of his father, confessed to her murder. Seven weeks later, her body was found in the Missouri river.
- On March 21, 1981, players of the Minnesota Fillies walked off the court before the starting lineups were announced in an away game against the Chicago Hustle in a protest over unpaid salaries. Referees and team coach Terry Kunze tried to convince the players to return and play their game, but at no avail. As a result, the Fillies, which had been averaging 1,000 to 1,500 in attendance per game, were suspended from the WBL by commissioner Sherwin Fischer, who called the walkout as "very detrimental to the league".

== Standings ==
| # | Coastal Division | | | | |
| # | Team | W | L | PCT | GB |
|---|---|---|---|---|---|
| 1 | z-Dallas Diamonds | 27 | 9 | .750 | – |
| 2 | x-New Jersey Gems | 23 | 13 | .639 | 4 |
| 3 | New Orleans Pride | 18 | 19 | .486 | 9.5 |
| 4 | San Francisco Pioneers | 14 | 22 | .389 | 13 |
| 5 | New England Gulls | 2 | 10 | .167 | ... |

| # | Midwest Division | | | | |
| # | Team | W | L | PCT | GB |
|---|---|---|---|---|---|
| 1 | z-Nebraska Wranglers | 27 | 9 | .750 | – |
| 2 | x-Chicago Hustle | 18 | 18 | .500 | 9 |
| 3 | St. Louis Streak | 14 | 21 | .400 | 12.5 |
| 4 | Minnesota Fillies | 7 | 28 | .200 | 19.5 |

Notes

- z – division champions
- x – clinched playoff spot

== Playoffs ==
Semifinals
Nebraska Wranglers | 2
Chicago Hustle | 0
Dallas Diamonds | 2
New Jersey Gems | 1

Finals
Nebraska Wranglers | 3
Dallas Diamonds | 2

== Statistics leaders ==
| Category | Player | Team | Stat |
|---|---|---|---|
| Points per game | Carol Blazejowski | New Jersey Gems | 29.6 |

== WBL awards ==
- Most Valuable Player: Rosie Walker, Nebraska Wranglers
- Coach of the Year: Greg Williams, Dallas Diamonds
- Owner of the Year: Michael Stavers, Dallas Diamonds

=== All-Pro team ===
First team

- Rosie Walker (Nebraska)
- Nancy Lieberman (Dallas)
- Carol Blazejowski (New Jersey)
- Althea Gwyn (Chicago)
- Inge Nissen (Chicago)
- Janice Thomas (New Jersey)

Second team

- Cindy Haugejorde (San Francisco)
- Molly Bolin (San Francisco)
- Carol Chason (Nebraska)
- Rosalind Jennings (Dallas)
- Cindy Brogdon (New Orleans)
- Paula Mayo (Chicago)
- Trish Roberts (St. Louis)
