= 1979–80 WBL season =

2nd WBL season

- League: Women's Professional Basketball League
- Sport: Basketball
- Duration: November 15, 1979 – April 9, 1980
- Teams: 14

Draft
- Top draft pick: Pat Colasurdo Mayo
- Picked by: San Francisco Pioneers

Regular season
- Top seed: New York Stars
- Season MVP: Ann Meyers (New Jersey); Molly Bolin (Iowa Cornets)
- Top scorer: Molly Bolin (Iowa Cornets)

Playoffs

Finals
- Champions: New York Stars
- Runners-up: Iowa Cornets

WBL seasons
- ← 1978–79 1980–81 →

The 1979–80 WBL season was the 2nd season of the Women's Professional Basketball League. The season ended with the New York Stars winning the WBL Championship, beating the Iowa Cornets 3 games to 1 in the WBL Finals.

The league was divided into three divisions, with the New Jersey Gems, New York Stars St. Louis Streak, Washington Metros and the Philadelphia Fox in the Eastern Division, the Iowa Cornets, Minnesota Fillies, Chicago Hustle and the Milwaukee Does in the Midwest and the Houston Angels, San Francisco Pioneers, California Dreams and the Dallas Diamonds in the West. Struggling financially, Philadelphia and Washington both disbanded after 10 games.

== Notable occurrences ==
- In June, former NBA player Dean Meminger was hired as the head coach of the New York Stars.
- Pat Colasurdo Mayo was selected with the first pick in the 1979 WBL draft by the San Francisco Pioneers.
- Former NBA coach Larry Costello was hired as the head coach of the Milwaukee Does.
- After sitting out the 1978–79 season and participating in the Indiana Pacers training camp, Ann Meyers signed with the New Jersey Gems in November.
- The season debut was on 15 November 1979, where the New York Stars defeated the New Orleans Pride, 120–112, before a record crowd of 8,452 in the Louisiana Superdome.
- On 26 November, Janie Fincher of the Chicago Hustle was traded to the Washington Metros for two third-round draft picks and an undisclosed amount of cash. As Chicago's most popular player, the trade turned out to be a very unpopular move with Chicago's fans, with many turning in their season tickets afterwards. Due to the uproar, the Hustle tried to get the trade voided but could not do so before the Metros folded with Fincher going into a dispersal draft with the other Metros players. Despite having a chance to select her with the 4th pick, the team traded the pick to the Iowa Cornets for Denise Sharps, and Fincher was then selected with the fifth pick by the St. Louis Streak. The Hustle however, then traded Adrian Mitchell to the Streak for "Future considerations" which turned out to be Fincher, and she returned to Chicago before the end of the month.
- On December 19, Liz Silcott scored 50 points for the St. Louis Streak in a 93–90 win against the Minnesota Fillies.
- On January 13, 1980, Molly Bolin, of the Iowa Cornets, broke her own WBL single game scoring record of 53 points when she scored 54 in a 109–93 win against the Minnesota Fillies. Two months later, on March 2, 1980, she broke the record again, scoring 55 points in another win against the Fillies despite dislocating her left shoulder early in the second quarter. That game, she also became the first WBL player to break the 1,000 point barrier in a single season.

== Standings ==
#	Eastern Division				
#	Team	W	L	PCT	GB
1	z-New York Stars	28	7	.800	–
2	x-New Orleans Pride	21	13	.618	6.5
3	New Jersey Gems	19	17	.528	9.5
4	St. Louis Streak	15	21	.417	13.5
5	Washington Metros	3	7	.300	...
6	Philadelphia Fox	2	8	.200	...

#	Midwest Division				
#	Team	W	L	PCT	GB
1	z-Iowa Cornets	24	12	.667	–
2	x-Minnesota Fillies	22	12	.647	1
3	Chicago Hustle	17	19	.472	7
4	Milwaukee Does	10	24	.294	13

#	Western Division				
#	Team	W	L	PCT	GB
1	z-Houston Angels	19	14	.576	–
2	x-San Francisco Pioneers	18	18	.500	2.5
3	California Dreams	11	18	.393	6
4	Dallas Diamonds	7	28	.200	13

Notes

- z – division champions
- x – clinched playoff spot

== Playoffs ==
Quarter finals
Houston Angels	1
San Francisco Pioneers	2

Quarter finals
Minnesota Fillies	2
New Orleans Pride	1

Semifinals
New York Stars	2
San Francisco Pioneers	0
Iowa Cornets	2
Minnesota Fillies	1

Finals
New York Stars	3
Iowa Cornets	1

== Statistics leaders ==
Category	Player	Team	Stat
Points per game	Molly Bolin	Iowa Cornets	32.8
Rebounds per game	Doris Draving	Iowa Cornets	14.9
Assists per game	Janice Thomas	New York Stars	8.6
Steals per game	Ann Meyers	New Jersey Gems	4.9
Blocks per game	Bertha Hardy	New Orleans Pride	2.7

== WBL awards ==
- Co-Most Valuable Players: Ann Meyers, New Jersey Gems, and Molly Bolin, Iowa Cornets
- Coach of the Year: Dean Meminger, New York Stars

=== All-Pro team ===
- Molly Bolin (Iowa)
- Ann Meyers (New Jersey)
- Rita Easterling (Chicago)
- Charlene McWhorter (Chicago)
- Alfreda Abernathy (Dallas)
- Paula Mayo (Houston)
- Doris Draving (Iowa)
- Heidi Nestor (Milwaukee)
- Marie Kocurek (Minnesota)
- Bertha Hardy (New Orleans)
- Sharon Farrah (New York)
- Janice Thomas (New York)
- Adrian Mitchell (St. Louis)
- Pat Mayo (San Francisco)
- Anita Ortega (San Francisco)
