= 1980 WBL All-Star Game =

Exhibition basketball game

West	East
115	112
	1	2	3	4	Total
West	25	31	33	26	115
East	30	27	26	29	112
- Date: January 30, 1980
- Venue: Alumni Hall, Chicago
- Coaches: Dean Meminger; Steve Kirk
- MVP: Charlene McWhorter
- Attendance: 2,742

The 1980 WBL All-Star Game was a basketball All-star game which was played on January 30, 1980, at the Alumni Hall in Chicago, during the 1979–80 season of the Women's Professional Basketball League.

The East team was coached by Dean Meminger of the New York Stars while the West was coached by Steve Kirk of the Iowa Cornets. Two players were selected from each of the 12 teams in the league.

Despite the East rallying from 12 points down with 2:04 left, behind Ann Meyers, the West came out on top 115–112.

Charlene McWhorter of the West team was named MVP after scoring a game high 31 points before fouling out with 7:02 minutes left.

== Team rosters ==
=== West ===
Player, Team	MIN	FGM	FGA	FTM	FTA	REB	AST	STL	PF	PTS
Molly Bolin, IOW	-	11	-	3	6	-	-	-	-	25
Alfredda Aberathy, DAL	-	8	-	6	9	16	-	-	-	22
Anita Ortega, SFP	-	3	-	7	10	-	-	-	-	13
Marie Kocurek, MIN	-	3	-	6	8	-	-	-	6	12
Paula Mayo, HOU	-	3	-	4	4	-	-	-	-	10
Pat Colasurdo Mayo, SFP	-	3	-	3	6	-	-	-	-	9
Jane Cook, CAL	-	2	-	4	5	-	-	-	-	8
Pat Montgomery, MIN	-	4	-	0	0	-	-	-	-	8
Doris Draving, IOW	-	1	-	2	2	-	-	-	-	4
Belinda Candler, HOU	-	1	-	0	0	-	-	-	-	2
Nancy Dunkle, CAL	-	1	-	0	0	-	-	-	-	2
Cathy Shoemaker, DAL	-	0	-	0	0	-	-	-	-	0
Totals	-	40	-	35	50	53	-	-	31	115

=== East ===
Player, Team	MIN	FGM	FGA	FTM	FTA	REB	AST	STL	PF	PTS
Charlene McWhorter, MIL	24	12	17	7	8	-	-	-	6	31
Heidi Nestor, MIL	-	7	-	3	5	-	-	-	-	17
Ann Meyers, NJG	-	7	-	1	2	7	6	5	-	15
Liz Silcott, STL	-	4	-	3	4	-	-	-	-	11
Donna Geils, NJG	-	1	-	7	9	-	-	-	-	9
Janice Thomas, NYS	-	3	-	2	2	-	-	-	-	8
Debra Waddy-Rossow, CHI	-	3	-	1	2	-	-	-	-	7
Augusta Forest, NOP	-	0	-	5	6	-	-	-	-	5
Adrian Mitchell, STL	-	0	-	4	4	-	-	-	-	4
Rita Easterling, CHI	24	1	-	1	2	-	6	-	-	3
Althea Gwyn, NYS	-	1	-	0	0	-	-	-	-	2
Sandra Smallwood, NOP	-	0	-	0	0	-	-	-	-	0
Totals	-	39	-	34	44	46	-	-	31	112

Boxscore
