= Ramona von Boeckman =

American basketball player

Personal information
- Born: 1950s
- Listed height: 5 ft 9.5 in (1.77 m)

Career information
- High school: Horn Lake (Horn Lake, Mississippi)
- College: Delta State (1974–1978)
- WBL draft: 1978: 1st round
- Drafted by: Minnesota Fillies
- Position: Guard

Career highlights
- 3× AIAW champion (1975–1977)
- Stats at Basketball Reference

Ramona von Boeckman is an American former basketball player. She played college basketball for Delta State University. Known for her defense and passing ability, where she was a member of the "Fab Five" starting lineup of Lusia Harris, Debbie Brock, Corneila Ward and Wanda Hairston that led Delta State to three straight AIAW championships from 1975 to 1977. She led the team in assists all four years and was inducted in the Delta State Hall of Fame in 1988.

Following her college career, von Boeckman was drafted by the Minnesota Fillies in the first round of the 1978 WBL draft. She was immediately traded to the Milwaukee Does for Trish Roberts but never played in the WBL.
