= Moravia High School =

Location
- 505 N Trussell Ave; Moravia, Iowa 52571; United States
- Coordinates: 40.894343°N 92.817996°W

Information
- Type: Public
- School district: Moravia Community School District
- Superintendent: Brad Breon
- Principal: Brad Breon
- Teaching staff: 15.12 (FTE)
- Grades: 6-12
- Enrollment: 216 (2023-2024)
- Student to teacher ratio: 14.29
- Colors: Blue and White
- Athletics conference: Bluegrass
- Mascot: Mohawk
- Website: www.moraviaschools.com

Moravia High School is an Appanoose County secondary school located in Moravia, Iowa, USA, part of the Moravia Community School District. The sports teams are collectively called "The Mohawks".

A small school district (216 students in grades 6–12), it has been growing in recent years. It was mentioned as a bronze medal school in U.S. News & World Report's "Best High Schools".

== Athletics ==
The Mohawks compete in the Bluegrass Conference, including the following sports:

- Volleyball
- Football (8-man)
- Cross Country
- Basketball (boys and girls)
- Wrestling
- Track and Field (boys and girls)
- Golf (boys and girls)
- Baseball
- Softball

== Notable alumni ==
- Molly Bolin Kazmer (Molly Van Benthuysen), one of the first professional women's basketball stars with the Iowa Cornets of the Women's Professional Basketball League, was a 1975 graduate of Moravia High School.
