= New Orleans Pride =

- League: WBL (1979–1981)
- Founded: 1979
- Dissolved: 1981
- History: New Orleans Pride (1979–1981)
- Arena: Louisiana Superdome; UNO Field House
- Location: New Orleans (1979–1981)
- Team colors: Red, White & Blue
- Ownership: John W. Simpson and Claudette Simpson

The New Orleans Pride was a women's professional basketball team located in New Orleans, United States, that competed in the Women's Professional Basketball League, the first women's pro league in the United States, from 1979 to the leagues folding following the 1980-81 WBL season. For both seasons, the team was coached by former NBA player and coach Butch Van Breda Kolff.

== Franchise history ==
=== Background ===
The Pride where founded by 32-year old stockbroker Steve Brown, John W. Simpson and his wife Claudette Simpson.

=== 1979–1980 ===
The Pride's 1979–80 season debut was on 15 November, 1979, where the New York Stars defeated the Pride, 120-112, before a record crowd of 8,452 in the Louisiana Superdome. After starting the season in the Western Division, the team was moved to the Eastern Division following the folding of Washington Metros and the Philadelphia Fox. The Pride finished the season with a 21–13 record, good for second place in the Eastern Division. It lost to the Minnesota Fillies in the first round of the playoffs, 1–2. Augusta Forest led the team in scoring and rebounding with averages of 18.8 points and 9.2 rebounds. Bertha Hardy, who was named to the WBL All-Pro team, came next, averaging 17.0 points, 8.2 rebounds and league leading 2.7 per game. The team finished in the upper half of the league in attendance, averaging around 2,000 spectators per game.

=== 1980–1981 ===
Prior to the season, general manager Steve Brown was replaced with Claudette Simpson. In March 1981, during the 1980–81 season, with the team having a 17-14 record, Van Breda Kolff was suspended for the rest of the season by the team which cited the coaches unpaid fines to the league and the recent poor performance where the team had lost five games in a row. In his stead, assistant coach Ray Scott served as an interim head coach. The Pride finished the season in third place in the Coastal Division, with a 18–19 record, and missed out of the playoffs. Cindy Brogdon of the Pride was named to the WBL All-Pro team after the season.

== Season-by-season record ==
Note: GP = Games played, W = Wins, L = Losses, W–L% = Winning percentage

Season	GP	W	L	W–L%	Finish	Playoffs
1979–80	34	21	13	.618	2nd, Eastern	Lost in First Round, 1–2 (Fillies)
1980–81	37	18	19	.486	3rd, Coastal	Did not qualify

== Individual awards ==
WBL All-Pro team

- Cindy Brogdon - 1981
- Bertha Hardy - 1980

WBL All-Star

- Sybil Blalock - 1981
- Cindy Brogdon - 1981
- Augusta Forest - 1980
- Sandra Smallwood - 1980

== Head coaches ==
- Butch Van Breda Kolff 1979–1981
- Ray Scott (interim) 1981
