= Debbie Mason =

American basketball player

Debbie "The Pearl" Mason is an American former professional basketball player who played in the Women's Professional Basketball League (WBL).

Mason played for the Queens College women's basketball team from 1971 to 1975. She went on to play professional basketball in Sweden for a single season before returning to the United States to play for the New York Stars. She was cut from the Stars due to her small stature (5 ft 5 in), and then signed to the New Jersey Gems, who felt her skills could make up for size.

Mason was inducted into the NYC Basketball Hall of Fame in 2011 in recognition of her contributions to basketball history, only the third woman to ever receive this honor.
