= Doris Felderhoff =

American basketball player

Personal information
- Born: c.1955
- Listed height: 6 ft 0 in (1.83 m)

Career information
- High school: Muenster (Muenster, Texas)
- College: Wayland Baptist (1973–1974); Stephen F. Austin (1974–1977)
- WBL draft: 1978: 2nd round
- Drafted by: Houston Angels
- Position: Center

Career history

Coaching
- 1977–1978: Stephen F. Austin (assistant)

Career highlights
- As player: 2× Kodak All-American (1976, 1977)
- Stats at Basketball Reference

Doris Felderhoff is an American former basketball player. She played college basketball for Wayland Baptist and Stephen F. Austin where she was a two time Kodak All-American.

Felderhoff attended Muenster High School in Texas where she set school records of 37.9 points per game and 1,097 career points in four years.

Following her college playing career, she served as an assistant for Stephen F. Austin during the 1977–1978 season.

In July 1978, she was drafted by the Houston Angels as a free agent in the 1978 WBL draft but she never played in the league.
