= Dave Wohl =

American basketball player, coach, and executive

Personal information
- Born: November 2, 1949 (age 77) Queens, New York, U.S.
- Listed height: 6 ft 4 in (1.93 m)
- Listed weight: 185 lb (84 kg)

Career information
- High school: East Brunswick (East Brunswick, New Jersey)
- College: Penn (1968–1971)
- NBA draft: 1971: 3rd round, 46th overall pick
- Drafted by: Philadelphia 76ers
- Playing career: 1971–1977
- Position: Point guard
- Number: 13, 11, 15
- Coaching career: 1978–2011

Career history

Playing
- 1971–1972: Philadelphia 76ers
- 1972: Portland Trail Blazers
- 1972–1974: Buffalo Braves
- 1974–1977: Houston Rockets
- 1977: New York / New Jersey Nets

Coaching
- 1978–1979: New Jersey Nets (assistant)
- 1979: Philadelphia Fox
- 1980–1982: Milwaukee Bucks (assistant)
- 1982–1985: Los Angeles Lakers (assistant)
- 1985–1988: New Jersey Nets
- 1988–1991: Miami Heat (assistant)
- 1992–1993: Sacramento Kings (assistant)
- 1993–1994: Los Angeles Clippers (assistant)
- 1998–1999: Los Angeles Lakers (assistant)
- 1999–2003: Orlando Magic (assistant)
- 2004–2007: Boston Celtics (assistant)
- 2009–2011: Minnesota Timberwolves (assistant)

Career highlights
- As assistant coach: NBA champion (1985)

Career NBA statistics
- Points: 2,553 (6.2 ppg)
- Rebounds: 558 (1.4 rpg)
- Assists: 1,397 (3.4 apg)
- Stats at NBA.com
- Stats at Basketball Reference

David Bruce Wohl (born November 2, 1949) is an American former basketball player, assistant coach, head coach, and professional basketball executive. Among other things, Wohl is the former head coach of the New Jersey Nets, the former general manager of the Los Angeles Clippers, and the former executive vice president of basketball operations for the Miami Heat. During his long assistant and head coaching career running between 1978 and 2011, Wohl became known as "Captain Video" for his extensive use of video to prepare his teams. He was an assistant coach on the Los Angeles Lakers' 1985 NBA championship team and the Boston Celtics team that won the 2008 NBA championship.

A 6 ft 2 in (1.88 m) guard who grew up in East Brunswick, New Jersey, Wohl was a star player in football and basketball in high school. He played collegiately at the University of Pennsylvania, where he was first-team All-Ivy League his senior year. Wohl was selected in the third round of the 1971 NBA draft by the Philadelphia 76ers. He played for five different NBA teams over a seven-year career, including the 76ers, the Portland Trail Blazers, the Buffalo Braves, the Houston Rockets and the New York/New Jersey Nets.

== Early life ==
Wohl was born on November 2, 1949, in Flushing, New York. His father was Jewish and mother Protestant. His father taught Wohl to find the good in people of all backgrounds. He attended East Brunswick High School, in East Brunswick, New Jersey. He was a quarterback on the school's football team, and was named first-team All-Middlesex County in 1966, for both his running and passing ability. He averaged 10.7 yards per carry, rushed for 14 touchdowns, and led the county in scoring. Wohl also passed for nine touchdowns, and had over 2,000 yards in total offense. The other first-team All-County quarterback that year was future NFL quarterback Joe Theismann. This was the second year Wohl had been named first-team All-County in football. In 1966, he was an honorable mention by the Associated Press (AP) for All-State in football.

In 1966-67, as a 6 ft (1.83 m) 165 lb (74.8 kg) senior guard, the left-handed Wohl was a unanimous selection as first-team All-Middlesex County in basketball as well. As a senior, he set school records for points in a season (499) and total career points (976). He also set school season records for foul shooting, assists and steals. This was his second season being named first-team All-County in basketball.

In May 1967, he was selected Middlesex County's Scholar-Athlete of the Year by the county's coaches. In addition to his football and basketball prowess, academically Wohl graduated 16th in a class of 401 students; and was an A− student and a member of the National Honor Society. Wohl was also a member of the track and field team, participating in the pole vault, high jump and long jump.

== College career ==
Wohl attend the University of Pennsylvania (Penn). He played one year on the freshman basketball team, and played varsity basketball at Penn from 1968 to 1971. As a guard on Penn's freshman basketball team (1967-68), he averaged 12.5 points per game, second highest on the team. Wohl's freshman coach, Digger Phelps, considered Wohl one of Penn's best defensive players and would assign him to defend the opposing team's toughest guard.

As a sophomore (1968-69), Wohl led Penn with a 16.1 points per game average, followed by fellow sophomore guard Steve Bilsky at 14.5 points per game. Wohl was named first-team All-Ivy League. He was also an honorable mention All-Big Five. In the 1969–70 season, Penn added sophomore forwards Corky Calhoun and Bob Morse to the starting team. Wohl took less shots that year as a junior (11.8 per game) than he did as a sophomore (15.2 per game), and his scoring average decreased to 14 points per game.

Penn's team, however, went from third in the Ivy League in 1968–69 (with a 10–4 conference record) to first in the Ivy League in 1969–70 (with a perfect 14–0 conference record). The 1969-70 Penn team had a 25–2 overall record. Penn lost to Niagara in the first round of the 1970 NCAA tournament, 79–69. Wohl had 11 points and five rebounds in that game. Penn finished the season ranked No. 13 by the Associated Press.

As a senior (1970-71), Wohl was second on the team in scoring (15.3 points per game) to Morse (15.4 points per game). Penn again had a perfect Ivy League record (14–0) and went into the 1971 NCAA tournament undefeated (26–0). Penn defeated Duquesne in the first round of the tournament, 70–65, with Wohl scoring 19 points. The Quakers next defeated South Carolina in the East Regional Semifinals, 79–64, with Wohl scoring 20 points. Penn then suffered a shocking loss to Villanova University in the East Regional Final, 90–47, their only loss of the year. Villanova reached the 1971 NCAA championship game, losing to UCLA, 68–62. Penn finished the season ranked No. 3 by the Associated Press. Wohl was named first-team All-Ivy League, along with teammate Calhoun.

Over his 81 game career at Penn, Wohl averaged 15.1 points and 2.8 rebounds per game. The Quakers' won-loss record during his three varsity seasons, under head coach Dick Harter, was 68–13.

== Professional career ==
The Philadelphia 76ers drafted Wohl in the third round of the 1971 NBA draft, 46th overall. Wohl started 32 of the 79 games in which he played for the 76ers during his rookie season (1971-72), under head coach Jack Ramsay. On the season, he averaged 20.6 minutes, 8.1 points, 2.9 assists and 1.9 rebounds per game. On October 2, 1972, before the start of the 1972-73 season, he was traded by the 76ers (now coached by Roy Rubin) to the Portland Trail Blazers for Dale Schlueter. Through that trade, Wohl avoided being on a 9–73 76ers team that is often considered the worst team in NBA history.

After playing in 22 games as a backup point guard for the Trail Blazers, in December 1972 he was acquired by the Buffalo Braves on waivers. Jack Ramsay, now coaching Buffalo, would once again be his head coach. The Braves intended to use Wohl as a backup point guard. He played 27.5 minutes per game over 56 games for the Braves that season, averaging 8.8 points, 4.6 assists and 1.6 rebounds per game. The next season (1973–74), Wohl was averaging about 15 minutes of play per game in 41 games with the Braves when he was traded in February 1974, along with 7 ft (2.13 m) center Kevin Kunnert, to the Houston Rockets for Jack Marin and Matt Goukas. In 26 games as the Rockets backup point guard that season, he averaged 6.0 points, 4.2 assists, and 1.7 steals in 17.3 minutes per game.

Wohl generally continued as a backup point guard during his career in Houston, but also was a starter for the Rockets in the 1974–75 season. In that first full season with the Rockets, he played in 75 games, averaging 23 minutes, 6.5 points, 4.5 assists and 1.5 rebounds per game. The next season (1975-76) he only played in 50 games, averaging 14 minutes per game.

Wohl began the 1976–77 season with the Rockets, but had only played in 14 games, averaging less than five minutes of playing time per game, when he was traded to the New York Nets for future draft considerations. Wohl played in 37 games for the Nets, averaging 25 minutes, 7.4 points, 3.4 assists and 2.1 rebounds per game. He played his final NBA season in 1977–78 with the now New Jersey Nets, appearing in ten games. The Nets released him on November 19, 1977.

Over his seven-year NBA playing career, Wohl played in 410 games, averaging nearly 20 minutes per game, principally as a backup point guard. He averaged 6.2 points, 3.4 assists, and 1.4 rebounds per game.

== Coaching and executive career ==
Wohl was hired as an assistant coach by the Nets in 1978–1979, under head coach Kevin Loughery. The following season, Wohl was hired as the general manager and head coach of the Philadelphia Fox in the Women's Professional Basketball League for the 1979–80 season. The team financially collapsed before the season ended.

He was hired next as an assistant coach by the Milwaukee Bucks, where he worked from 1979 to 1982. He coached under future Naismith Basketball Hall of Fame head coach Don Nelson. He was an assistant coach with the Los Angeles Lakers from 1982 to 1985, under future Hall of Fame head coach Pat Riley. While with the Lakers, Wohl received the nickname "Captain Video" because of his extensive development and use of video study systems to help players in practices and in games to improve their understanding and performance. He was an assistant coach on the Lakers 1985 NBA championship team.

In August 1985, the Nets signed Wohl to a three-year contract as their new head coach, to replace Stan Albeck. Wohl became the sixth head coach over the Nets past five seasons. He understood that the Nets franchise had a recent history of instability at many levels, but believed his experience provided him with the ability to develop stability in coaching and in the team’s play. He was considered an able, inventive and knowledgeable assistant coach, and technically skilled at diagramming plays. At the time, Riley said Wohl had been a tremendous asset for the Lakers, and had a great basketball mind.

The Nets original head coaching choice was the 1984–85 Villanova Wildcats NCAA championship men's basketball team head coach Rollie Massimino, who backed out of taking the job after the Nets thought they had an agreement to bring him on as their new coach. Massimino decided not to take the job just hours before the news conference scheduled to introduce him as the Nets new head coach.

Wohl led the Nets to the playoffs in his first season (1985-86). In December 1987, now into his third season, the Nets fired Wohl after 15 games. The Nets teams during his tenure were noted for player personnel problems on and off the court that were independent of Wohl. Arguably the most notable problem came with the suspension of star player Michael Ray Richardson in the 1985-86 season for drug use. By the end of his tenure, Wohl's relationship with some of the other Nets players also was deteriorating. On his firing, one New Jersey columnist wrote "Wohl is lucky. He's free".

Wohl served as a scout for the Miami Heat before the team's first season, and later became an assistant coach with the Heat from 1988 to 1991. After that he was an assistant coach with the Sacramento Kings (1992-93) and the Los Angeles Clippers (1993-94). During this time period, he was also a radio and television color analyst for the Heat (1991-92).

In February 1995, during the 1994–95 NBA season, the 45-year old Wohl was hired as the executive vice president of basketball operations for the Miami Heat. In pursuing the job, Wohl had sent the new Heat owner Micky Arison an unsolicited 10-page outline that impressed Arison enough that he hired Wohl. Arison was impressed both by Wohl's basketball knowledge and Wohl's aggressiveness in pursuing the position. On the same day Arison hired Wohl, Arison fired the Heat's other front office personnel, and fired Kevin Loughery as the Heat's head coach. Loughery had given Wohl his first NBA assistant coaching job and had been Wohl's teammate in Philadelphia, and it was Wohl who had to tell Loughery he was fired as head coach (though Loughery was also told he could stay on with the team as an executive vice president of personnel). Wohl held the job with the Heat until 1997.

Wohl returned to assistant coaching for the 1998-99 season with the Lakers. He was then an assistant coach for four seasons with the Orlando Magic, under head coach Glenn "Doc" Rivers (1999-2003). Wohl next moved with Rivers to the Boston Celtics for three seasons (2003-2007). From 2007 to 2009 he was the Celtics' assistant general manager. The Celtics were NBA champions in 2008. Wohl was an assistant coach with the Minnesota Timberwolves for two seasons, from 2009 to 2011.

Wohl later became the pro scouting director for the Los Angeles Clippers. On June 16, 2014, Wohl became the Clippers' general manager. He was once again working under Doc Rivers, who was both the Clippers' head coach and president of basketball operations (with Kevin Eastman named vice president of basketball operations). Although Wohl had the title of general manager he served mostly in an advisory role to Rivers, who as president of basketball operations had the final say on all basketball matters. Less than two weeks later, the Clippers took C. J. Wilcox in the first round of the 2014 NBA draft, 28th overall. Wilcox played three years in the NBA as a reserve guard. They had no draft picks in 2015, and purchased the rights to the New Orleans Pelicans second round pick, Branden Dawson, 56th overall. Dawson played six games for the Clippers in his only NBA season.

In 2016, the Clippers selected Brice Johnson with their first pick in the 2016 NBA draft, 25th overall. They then selected Cheick Diallo in the second round of the 2016 NBA draft, 33rd overall, and traded his rights to the New Orleans Pelicans for the rights to David Michineau and Diamond Stone, whom the Pelicans had selected with the 39th and 40th picks in the second round of that draft. Johnson played only 12 games for the Clippers and was out of the NBA after two years. Stone played in seven games for the Clippers his rookie season, which was his only NBA season. Guard David Michineau was not signed for the 2016–17 NBA season following a sub-par NBA Summer League performance with the team in Orlando. Diallo played five seasons in the NBA as a reserve forward and center. The Clippers had no draft picks in 2017.

On August 24, 2017, owner Steve Ballmer made considerable changes to the Clippers' front offices. Ballmer kept Rivers as his coach, but made Lawrence Frank the new president of the team's basketball operations. Wohl was replaced as general manager by former Oklahoma City Thunder assistant general manager Michael Winger. The nearly 68-year old Wohl stayed on with the Clippers as a special adviser to Frank.

== Legacy and honors ==
Wohl realized as a high school senior that he was not going to be an elite basketball player based on his physical talents; but still wanted to play basketball at the highest levels. He developed a focus on more intangible factors, and worked on growing his basketball IQ, being a great teammate, and a hard worker. Wohl strove to be in top physical shape, with a high level of stamina, so he could always play hard in games.

Former NBA coach and executive Eddie Donovan said Wohl “was born to coach … He played like a coach on the court. He loved and had a feeling for the game”. In becoming a head coach, Wohl recognized he was a marginal NBA player. Wohl believed that the qualities he had which allowed him to play seven years in the NBA, however, were valuable to his becoming a successful coach in the league. Wohl said of himself, “because I was a fairly smart player. I always tried to find a role on the team and fit it. Getting the most out of available material is what coaching is all about. It helps to know when you have players who are not so gifted that there is a place for them to fit in and make a contribution”.

In 1975, Wohl was inducted into the Big Five Hall of Fame. In 2016, his 1970–71 Penn Quaker team was inducted into the Big Five Hall of Fame. Wohl is also a member of the University of Pennsylvania’s Athletics Hall of Fame. On January 19, 1987, East Brunswick and the New Jersey Nets honored Wohl with a Dave Wohl Day. He is a member of the New Jersey State Interscholastic Athletic Association Hall of Fame.

== Personal life ==
As a high school student, Wohl taught swimming to children who had suffered brain injuries.

Since retiring from the NBA as a coach and executive he has hosted a podcast, Dave’s Front Office, where he discusses basketball topics with NBA executives, coaches, and agents.

== Career statistics ==
Legend
GP	Games played	GS	Games started	MPG	Minutes per game
FG%	Field goal percentage	3P%	3-point field goal percentage	FT%	Free throw percentage
RPG	Rebounds per game	APG	Assists per game	SPG	Steals per game
BPG	Blocks per game	PPG	Points per game	**Bold**	Career high

=== NBA ===
==== Regular season ====
Year	Team	GP	GS	MPG	FG%	FT%	RPG	APG	SPG	BPG	PPG
1971–72	Philadelphia	**79**	32	20.6	.429	.757	1.9	2.1			8.1
1972–73	Portland	22		17.9	.412	.727	.9	3.1			5.4
1972–73	Buffalo	56		**27.5**	.456	.790	1.6	**4.6**			**8.8**
1973–74	Buffalo	41		14.8	.400	.700	.7	3.1	.8	.0	4.0
1973–74	Houston	26		17.3	**.480**	.786	.7	4.2	**1.7**	.0	6.0
1974–75	Houston	75		23.0	.439	.745	1.5	4.5	1.0	.1	6.5
1975–76	Houston	50		14.0	.405	.776	1.1	2.2	.5	.0	3.4
1976–77	Houston	14		4.4	.412	**1.000**	.4	1.1	.0	.0	1.3
1976–77	N.Y. Nets	37		25.0	.399	.671	**2.1**	3.4	1.1	**.2**	7.4
1977–78	New Jersey	10		11.8	.353	.917	.4	1.3	.3	.0	3.5
Career		410	32	19.9	.430	.750	1.4	3.4	.9	.1	6.2

==== Playoffs ====
Year	Team	GP	MPG	FG%	FT%	RPG	APG	SPG	BPG	PPG
1975	Houston	4	2.0	1.000	–	.3	.5	.3	.0	1.5

== Head coaching record ==
Legend
Regular season	G	Games coached	W	Games won	L	Games lost	W–L %	Win–loss %
Playoffs	PG	Playoff games	PW	Playoff wins	PL	Playoff losses	PW–L %	Playoff win–loss %

Team	Year	G	W	L	W–L%	Finish	PG	PW	PL	PW–L%	Result
New Jersey	1985–86	82	39	43	.476	3rd in Atlantic	0	0	3	.000	Lost in First Round
New Jersey	1986–87	82	24	58	.298	4th in Atlantic	—	—	—	—	Missed Playoff
New Jersey	1987–88	15	2	13	.133	(Fired)	—	—	—	—	—
Career		179	65	114	.363		3	0	3	.000	
