= Pat Colasurdo Mayo =

American basketball player

Pat Mayo
Personal information
- Born: 1957 (age 68–69)
- Listed height: 5 ft 10 in (1.78 m)

Career information
- High school: Holy Family Academy (Bayonne, New Jersey)
- College: Montclair (1975–1979)
- WBL draft: 1979: 1st round, 1st overall pick
- Drafted by: San Francisco Pioneers
- Position: Forward

Career history
- 1979–1981: San Francisco Pioneers

Career highlights
- WBL All-Star (1980); WBL All-Pro (1980); Kodak All-American (1979)
- Stats at Basketball Reference

Patricia Colasurdo Mayo (born 1957) is an American former basketball player. Following a college career at Montclair State University, she played professionally for the San Francisco Pioneers in the Women's Professional Basketball League, the first women's pro basketball league in the United States.

== Early life ==
Raised in Bayonne, New Jersey, Colasurdo attended Holy Family Academy in her hometown, where she had more than 1,200 points, 1,000 rebounds, 400 blocked shots and 500 steals. During her senior season, she averaged 30 points and 16 rebounds per game.

== College career ==
During her senior season at Montclair State University (MSU), she averaged 23 points and 11.5 rebounds and was named Kodak All-American. She finished her career with 1.646 points and a school record 1.076 rebounds during her four-year career at MSU.

In 1991, she was inducted into MSU's Hall of Fame.

== Professional career ==
Mayo was drafted with the 1st pick in the 1979 WBL draft by the Pioneers. During her first season, she averaged 15.8 points and 9.1 rebounds per game and was named WBL All-Pro and selected to the 1980 WBL All-Star Game. The following season, Frank LaPorte was fired as head coach and replaced with former New York Stars coach Dean Meminger. Under the new coach, Mayo's performance fell of drastically, with her averaging 6.6 points and 4.2 rebounds before being placed on the injury list after appearing in five games. In January 1981, she left the Pioneers and retired from playing.

== Personal life ==
In 1978, she married Bob Mayo.
