= Greg Williams (basketball) =

American basketball coach (born 1947)

Personal information
- Born: January 27, 1947 (age 79)
- Listed height: 5 ft 9 in (1.75 m)

Career information
- High school: Portland (Portland, Indiana)
- College: Rice (1966–1969)
- NBA draft: 1969: undrafted
- Position: Guard
- Coaching career: 1970–2015

Career history

Coaching
- 1970–1975: Rice (men's assistant)
- 1978–1980: Houston Angels (assistant)
- 1980–1981: Dallas Diamonds
- 1981–1983: SMU (assistant)
- 1984: Dallas Diamonds
- 1985–1990: Houston
- 1990–1997: Colorado State
- 1997: Utah Starzz (assistant)
- 1998–2000: Detroit Shock (assistant)
- 2001–2002: Detroit Shock
- 2003–2005: Dayton (assistant)
- 2005–2015: Rice

Career highlights
- As player: SWC co-Player of the Year (1969); First-team All-SWC (1969); As head coach: WAC Coach of the Year (1996); SWC Coach of the Year (1988); WABA Coach of the Year (1984); WBL Coach of the Year (1981); WAC champion (1996); WABA champion (1984); As assistant coach: WBL champion (1979)

Greg Williams (born January 27, 1947) is an American retired basketball coach. He played college basketball for Rice before starting a 45-year coaching career.

He coached both incarnations of the Dallas Diamonds. In the 1980–81 season, the team went 27–9 and he was named Women's Professional Basketball League Coach of the Year. After coaching at Southern Methodist University, he was named head coach of the WABA Dallas Diamonds. With his leadership, the team posted a 19–2 record. The team was the league champion and Williams was named WABA Coach of the Year.

He is a 1970 graduate of Rice University and spent the final 10 seasons of his coaching career (2005–2015) as the Rice women's basketball head coach. He lettered in basketball for three years while playing for the Owls and was named all-Southwest Conference as well as league Co-MVP in 1969. He earned his degree in physical education and was immediately hired as assistant coach of the men's team. Under the leadership of Don Knodel, Williams helped the Owls win the 1970 SWC championship.

Williams retired at the end of the 2014–15 season with a 141–170 record at Rice and an overall head coaching record of 342–309. He had also served as women's head coach at Houston and Colorado State.

== Head coaching record ==
Legend
Regular season	G	Games coached	W	Games won	L	Games lost	W–L %	Win–loss %
Playoffs	PG	Playoff games	PW	Playoff wins	PL	Playoff losses	PW–L %	Playoff win–loss %

=== WNBA ===
Team	Year	G	W	L	W–L%	Finish	PG	PW	PL	PW–L%	Result
Detroit	2001	32	10	22	.313	6th in East	—	—	—	—	Missed playoffs
Detroit	2002	10	0	10	.000	(replaced)	—	—	—	—	—
Career		42	10	32	.238		—	—	—	—	
