= Connie Kunzmann =

American basketball player (1956-1981)

Personal information
- Born: July 3, 1956 Spencer, Iowa, U.S.
- Died: February 7, 1981 (aged 24) Omaha, Nebraska, U.S.
- Listed height: 6 ft 1 in (1.85 m)

Career information
- High school: Everly (Everly, Iowa)
- College: Wayne State (Nebraska) (1974–1978)
- Playing career: 1978–1981
- Position: Forward / center
- Number: 44

Career history
- 1978–1980: Iowa Cornets
- 1980–1981: Nebraska Wranglers

Career highlights
- First-team All-NCC (1977)
- Stats at Basketball Reference

Connie Renea Kunzmann (July 3, 1956 – February 7, 1981) was an American professional basketball player who was a member of the Iowa Cornets and the Nebraska Wranglers in the Women's Professional Basketball League (WBL) from 1978 to 1981. Kunzmann made the transition from halfcourt six-on-six basketball in high school to the traditional five-on-five full court game in college and the pros. She attended Wayne State College in Wayne, Nebraska, where she played on the school's basketball and softball teams. In 1978, she signed with the Iowa Cornets of the newly-formed WBL, which was the first women's professional basketball league in the United States.

Kunzmann was killed on February 7, 1981, by Lance Tibke, who later pleaded guilty to second degree murder. He was sentenced to 10 to 40 years in prison, but was paroled after serving less than nine years. Kunzmann's team, the Nebraska Wranglers, canceled their game on February 10 when investigators disclosed that she had been killed. They returned to the court a day later donning black bands on their uniforms in memory of Kunzmann. The Wranglers went on to win the WBL Championship. Kunzmann's death was a national news story – with reports being filed regularly during the search for her body, which was hindered for nearly a week by poor weather conditions. Her remains were located in the Missouri River on March 28, halfway between Dodge Park and the Mormon Bridge. An autopsy concluded the cause of death was blunt force trauma to the head by an object, likely a tire iron. Kunzmann was interred at Lone Tree Cemetery in Everly.

== Early life ==
Kunzmann was born on July 3, 1956, in Spencer, Iowa, to Ray and Elanor Kunzmann. The family later moved to Moneta, Iowa. Kunzamnn's father died during her childhood, which according to her mother, caused Connie to consume herself in basketball.

Kunzmann attended Everly High School in Everly, Iowa. She played on the school's six-on-six basketball team from 1971 to 1974. During her sophomore season, Kunzmann led the all state six-on-six players in steals. She was named The Des Moines Register All-Iowa Second Team following her junior season. After playing her first three seasons at guard, Everly's principal Larry Johnson suggested she switch to forward. She led her team in scoring that season with 34 points per game. She was named to the Sioux City Journal All-Northwest Iowa First Team, the Iowa Daily Press Association All-Iowa Third Team and The Des Moines Register All-Iowa Sixth Team.

After graduating high school, Kunzmann enrolled at Wayne State College in Wayne, Nebraska. She played for the Wildcats women's basketball and softball teams. On February 3, 1975, she scored 33 points in a basketball game against the Midland University Warriors. Her points total set a team record for most scored in a single game. She set the record again, with 40 points, during a game on December 6, 1975. She also had 15 rebounds in that game. Norma Boetel, the South Dakota State Jackrabbits women's basketball head coach, said of Kuzmann in 1976, "Wayne [State] is led by Connie Kunzmann, a tall, mobile gal who shoots well, rebounds well and plays fine defense." Kunzmann finished the 1975–76 season with an average of a 20.1 points and 14.4 rebounds per game.

Kunzmann broke her ankle sliding into third base during a Wildcats softball game against the Nebraska Cornhuskers on April 2, 1976. She recovered from her injury in time for the basketball season. On December 30, 1976, she scored 37 points, leading the Wildcats to of 79–69 victory over the Northern Colorado Bears in the championship game of the Chadron State College Holiday Tournament. Her junior year, Kunzmann was named Wayne State College Athlete of the Year and was named First Team All-Nebraska College Conference in basketball. She averaged 20.4 points and 13.3 rebounds per game during the 1976–77 season. Kunzmann is the career leader for Wayne State in rebounds, with 1,271.

== Professional career ==
Kunzmann signed with the Iowa Cornets of the fledgling Women's Professional Basketball League (WBL) in 1978. Her professional debut came on December 1 in a preseason game against the Chicago Hustle. She went 6-for-6 from the field and 2-for-2 from the free throw line, finishing the game with 14 points in the Cornets 114–105 victory. She made the Cornets' starting lineup during their regular season opener on December 15, against the Minnesota Fillies. Along with other members of the Cornets, Kunzman appeared in the 1979 film Scoring, which starred Pete Maravich.

Kunzmann and other Cornets staff and players reported that payroll checks issued to them on March 1, 1980 bounced. The team eventually made good on their payments. The Cornets made it to the WBL Championship Series in 1980, but lost to the New York Stars. In the deciding fourth game of the series, Kunzmann scored 20 points and grabbed 12 rebounds. At the end of the season, the Cornets held a banquet at Falbo's Restaurant in Des Moines. Kunzmann was awarded the team's "hustle award". During the off-season, Kunzmann coached a girl's six-on-six basketball camp in Cedar Rapids along with teammates Molly Bolin, Tanya Crevier and Nancy Wellen.

The Cornets went through a tumultuous off-season as players and staff publicly aired their grievances against the team's general manager, Rod Lein. The Cornets head coach, Steve Kirk, and two other staff members resigned because they did not want to work under Lien. He eventually resigned as general manager, but not before Kunzmann announced her intention to follow Kirk to his new team, the Nebraska Wranglers. She started the 1980–81 season coming off the bench for the Wranglers.

Following her death in 1981, the WBL named an award after Kunzmann. Sybil Blalock of the New Orleans Pride won the inaugural Connie Kunzmann Hustle and Harmony Award.

== Death and subsequent events ==
Kunzmann was reported missing by a coach for her team, the Nebraska Wranglers, on February 7, 1981. She was last seen the night before at Tiger Tom's Bar in Omaha. Police were soon investigating her disappearance as a homicide. An arrest warrant was issued for Lance Edward Tibke, who was with Kunzmann at the bar the night she disappeared. Absent a body, police asserted that Tibke took Kunzmann to Dodge Park, where the two got into an argument that led to her murder. Police believed her body was dumped in the Missouri River. Tibke turned himself in to police and confessed that he killed Kunzmann, but claimed it was in self-defense. He was charged with second degree murder. At his arraignment, Tibke waived his right to a preliminary hearing and his bond was set at $15,000, which was posted. The Associated Press article on Kunzmann's death was published in a number of newspapers across the United States.

The Nebraska Wranglers postponed a game they were scheduled to play on February 10 against the Chicago Hustle. The team released the following statement:

Connie was more than our teammate. She was a friend to each of us, just as every member of this team is. We play together as a team, as a family. Connie was a member of our family. Her loss is felt more deeply than one we work with. It is felt as one we love and live with.

We feel that Connie was the type player that is a most valuable part of any team. She was talented, yet maybe not the most outstanding we have. However, Connie provided that intangible that is so important. In any situation, in any game, in any relationship she gave more than she had to get a positive benefit from it. Each of us knows that anything Connie was assigned to handle, she could more than measure up to.

Never did you hear her complain about her position on the team or in life. She did not accept it, she attempted in every way to make it better. She did it for herself, she did it for those she knew. The word 'impossible' was not known to her. It was because of Connie, and the attitude she possessed and passed on to us, that this team has found the success it has.

She can't be replaced on our roster. She can't be replaced in our hearts. Athletes and people like Connie do not come along every day. We are deeply hurt that this happened. We are frightened that such incidents even occur in our world. We live in an age when life is threatened even at conception. We hate that Connie was taken from us and her family at this point in her life. Her memory will remain with us forever. Her life will become ours. We will live and play as Connie would have, as Connie would want us to do.

— Nebraska Wranglers press release

The Wranglers returned to the court on February 12, donning black arm bands on their jerseys in memory of Kunzmann. The team went on to win the WBL Championship that season. In 2010, Holly Warlick was asked about Kunzmann's death. The two played for the Wranglers and shared a room in Omaha. Warling said:

Well, Connie was my roommate in Nebraska and she left and didn't come home and so didn't think anything of it because she had done that before. And then the next day, actually that Friday – The day that she was missing I went to the All-Star Game and called and said she hadn't come back.

[...]

When she didn't come home it was kind of like, 'Well she'll be back in the morning,' and kind of one of those things where you don't worry. But then when they don't show up next day, next day you obviously get worried.

[...]

Well, I think [members of the Wranglers] were a little devastated at first. But we knew Connie, her personality, and just knew that she would want us to continue to play and win the championship so that's kind of what we did. We kind of made it our mission to win not only for us but for her as well.

— Holly Warlick, 2010

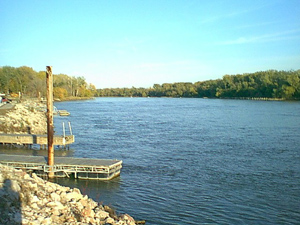
Police believed that Kunzmann was killed at Dodge Park (pictured) and her body was disposed of in the Missouri River. Lance Tibke pleaded guilty to the second degree murder of Kunzmann.

Nebraska State Patrol utilized a helicopter and diving unit in the search for Kunzmann's body. The search was called off on February 11 due to freezing temperatures and floating ice chunks in the river. They resumed the search of February 17, but the Douglas County Sheriffs Department announced that if her body was not found by the end of the day the search would be permanently suspended. Police announced the following day they had discovered a blood stained jacket, believed to be Kunzmann's, at the Springwell Cemetery.

Kunzmann's funeral service was held on March 6 at Hope Lutheran Church in Everly, Iowa. On March 28, her body was found snagged on a fallen branch in the Missouri River. The body was located midway between the Mormon Bridge and Dodge Park. An autopsy determined the cause of death was blunt force trauma, likely caused by a tire iron. The body also had numerous stab wounds, which Jones concluded did not lead to Kunzmann's death. On April 2, a grave-side service for Kunzmann was held at Lone Tree Cemetery in Everly.

Tibke's defense attorney filed an unsuccessful motion to make his confession inadmissible. Evidence emerged that three police officers responded to Tibke's house the night after the murder at the request of his father, Edward Tibke, who was a member of the Omaha Police Department. On June 16, Tibke entered a guilty plea to the second degree murder charge and was taken back into police custody. He was sentenced to 10 to 40 years in prison on July 10 by Douglas County District Judge Paul Hickman. During an interview with sports columnist Ira Berkow in 1982, Tibke was asked about Kunzmann's murder, stating, "I began to pound her and pound her. She said, 'Stop it, stop it, stop it. Please don't.' But I couldn't stop. I don't know why. She was a nice girl. I didn't have anything against her." Tibke was paroled from the Nebraska State Penitentiary on June 25, 1990, after serving only nine years of his sentence.

In 1986, Kunzmann was posthumously inducted into the Wayne State College Athletic Hall of Fame. Every WBL player, including Kunzmann, was inducted into the Women's Basketball Hall of Fame "Trailblazers of the Game" wing in 2018.

== See also ==
- List of basketball players who died during their careers
