= San Francisco Pioneers (WBL) =

- Division: Western Division (1979–1980); Coastal Division (1980–1981)
- League: Women's Professional Basketball League
- Founded: 1979
- Folded: 1981
- History: San Francisco Pioneers; 1979–1981
- Arena: San Francisco Civic Auditorium (1979-1981)
- Location: San Francisco, CA
- Team colors: Columbia Blue, yellow, white

The San Francisco Pioneers were an American professional basketball team that played two seasons in the Women's Professional Basketball League (WBL) from 1979 to 1981. The first women's professional basketball team in San Francisco, California, it was owned by a stockbroker named Marshall Geller and partners, including Alan Alda and Mike Conners, and played its home games at the San Francisco Civic Auditorium. Geller, who named the team, and his ownership group acquired the basketball team for a $100,000 expansion fee.

== History ==
=== 1979–80 ===
In their first season, the Pioneers roster was composed primarily of standout players who had competed at colleges and universities in California. Coached by Frank LaPorte, the Pioneers finished their first regular season with an 18-18 record. After winning a first round playoff game against the Houston Angels, their season concluded after losing to the eventual WBL champion, the New York Stars. Marshall Geller was named the WBL Owner of the Year.

Anita Ortega, a graduate of University of California, Los Angeles (UCLA), finished the Pioneers first season as the leading point scorer with 867 points, an average of 24.1 points per game, and the team's leader in assists, with 187. Kim Hansen, a graduate of Grand Valley State, was the team's top rebounder, pulling down 383 rebounds, and Pat Mayo, a graduate of Montclair State, led the team in steals, with 199.

=== 1980–81 ===
Approximately two months into their second season, LaPorte was fired and replaced by a former National Basketball Association (NBA) player, Dean Meminger. During the previous season, Meminger, as the coach of the New York Stars, had won the WBL title. The Pioneers finished their second, and final, season with a record of 14-22. In their second season, "Machine Gun" Molly Bolin, a graduate of Grandview College, led the Pioneers in scoring, finishing with 733 points, a 26.8 points per game average. Doris Draving, a graduate of East Stroudsbourg State, led the team in rebounding, pulling down 314 rebounds, and Cardie Hicks, a graduate of California State University, Northridge, led the team in assists, with 126.

== Season-by-season record ==
Note: GP = Games played, W = Wins, L = Losses, W–L% = Winning percentage

Season	GP	W	L	W–L%	Finish	Playoffs
1979–80	36	18	18	.500	2nd, Western	Lost in semi-finals, 0–2 (Stars)
1980–81	36	14	22	.389	4th, Coastal	DNQ

== Individual awards ==
WBL All-Pro team

- Anita Ortega - 1980
- Cindy Haugejorde - 1981
- Molly Bolin - 1981
- Pat Mayo - 1980

WBL All-Star

- Anita Ortega - 1980
- Cindy Haugejorde - 1981
- Cardie Hicks - 1981
- Molly Bolin - 1981
- Pat Mayo - 1980

== Head coaches ==
- Frank LaPorte (1979–1980)
- Dean Meminger (1980–1981)
