= Dallas Diamonds (basketball) =

- Founded: 1979
- Dissolved: 1981
- History: Dallas Diamonds; 1979–1981 (WBL); 1984 (WABA)
- Arena: Dallas Convention Center (1979–1980); Moody Coliseum (1980–81)
- Location: Dallas, Texas
- Team colors: blue, white
- Head coach: Dean Weese (1979–1980); Ray Scott (1980); Greg Williams (1980–81)
- Ownership: Judson Phillips (1979–1980); Mike Staver (1980–81)
- Championships: WABA: 1 (1984)
- Division titles: WBL: 1 (1981)

The Dallas Diamonds were an American women's professional basketball team. They played in the Women's Professional Basketball League (WBL), the first women's professional basketball team in the United States, from 1979 to 1981 and later in the Women's American Basketball Association (WABA) in 1984.

The star of both incarnations of the team was Nancy Lieberman, an Olympic medalist and former All-American.

== History ==
=== WBL ===
==== 1979–80 season ====
The Diamonds were an expansion team for the 1979–80 WBL season, along with the California Dream, New Orleans Pride, Philadelphia Fox, San Francisco Pioneers, St. Louis Streak, and the Washington Metros.

The Diamonds owner, Judson Phillips, hired legendary women's basketball coach, Dean Weese, of the Wayland Baptist Flying Queens. They also secured radio rights for their games with KAAM of Dallas. These games were broadcast by Eric Nadel, who later became the voice of the Texas Rangers baseball team.

In the 1979 draft, the Diamonds selected: Alfredda Abernathy (1st), Valerie Goodwin (2nd), Christy Earnhardt (3rd), Sharon McClanahan (4th), Heidi Nolte (5th), Cindy Bruton (6th), Joanette Boutte (7th), Diann Nestle (8th), Deneice Gray (9th), and Beth Anman (10th). Several of these players were former Wayland Baptist stars under Dean Weese.

The 1979–80 season began on November 23, 1979, with a loss against New Orleans, 106–93. Returning to the Dallas Convention Center, the Diamonds beat California 116–100 to even their record at 1–1. They then lost their next seven in a row. By the end of 1979, their record was 3–11.

The Diamonds' biggest victory was over the New York Stars (28–7), who would become the WBL Champions for the 1979–1980 season. The 115–100 home victory would be the last Diamonds victory this season, as they ended the year with an 11-game losing streak. When the losing streak reached five games (7–22), Dean Weese was relieved of his coaching duties in favor of Ray Scott. The team under Coach Scott lost their last six games to end the year 7–28.

From a statistical standpoint, Alfredda Abernathy (Alabama State) had a phenomenal year, averaging 27.0 points and 14.3 rebounds per game. As a team, the Diamonds were 7–11 at home and 0–17 on the road. New ownership was added during the season, as Dallas real estate investor Mike Staver took over the team. Along with General Manager Nancy Nichols, Staver began a search to improve the team. They hired Houston Angels' assistant coach Greg Williams as their new head coach. Williams had been instrumental in the Angels winning the first WBL Championship in 1978–1979, and the Angels had also been a playoff team in 1979–80.

==== 1980–81 season ====
The last-place finish gave the Diamonds the first pick in the 1980–81 draft, and that pick was Old Dominion's Nancy Lieberman.

The Diamonds went from 7–28 to 27–9 in one season, and it all started with the outstanding talent from the 1980 draft. The Diamonds drafted: Nancy Lieberman (1st Old Dominion), Peggie Gillom (2nd Mississippi U), Hattie Browning (3rd Texas), Gwen Walker (4th Arkansas-Monticello), Mary Murphy (5th Northwestern), Vanessa Barnes (6th Tuskegee), Julie Maxey (7th Missouri), Sherri Fancher (8th Carson-Newman), Brenda Winfield (9th Winston-Salem), and Linda Newcomb (10th Northeastern La.). A significant signing came from an undrafted player from Erskine College named Rosalind "Pig" Jennings who would be voted 2nd Team All-WBL in 1981.

Dallas began with a home victory at their new home, Moody Coliseum on the SMU campus, on December 5, but followed it up with a road loss in New Jersey. This would be Dallas' 18th consecutive road loss. The streak was broken on December 9 with a 102–92 victory against the New England Gulls. The Diamonds ended 1980 with a 5–2 record. At the end of January, their record had improved to 10–6, and stood at 18–7 by the end of February.

During the year, the Diamonds' major competition came from the Nebraska Wranglers. As the season was drawing to a close, the two teams were fighting for home-court advantage in the playoffs. On March 30, the Diamonds met for the sixth time. The Diamonds needed to outscore Nebraska by 26 points to secure home-court advantage. The 108–85 victory just fell short of their goal.

Dallas' playoff opponent was the New Jersey Gems. The Gems took the first game, on April 3, 1981, 91–86 at St. Peter's College. Dallas won the next game, on April 4, 1981, 92–85 at SMU before 3,278 fans. Dallas eliminated the Gems with a 107–88 victory before 4,482 fans. The Gems' Carol Blazejowski finished with 36 points on 15-of-26 shooting, while Nancy Lieberman scored 35 points and had 10 rebounds for the Diamonds.

The Championship series matched the 27–9 Diamonds against the 27–9 Wranglers. Nebraska took Game 1 in Omaha, 89–72. Dallas took Game 2 in Omaha, 106–93. On Good Friday, April 17, Dallas took Game 3, 96–88, before 8,117 fans. In Game 4, before 7,886 fans, Dallas took a 76–64 lead into the fourth quarter but eventually lost, 94–93. This set up Game 5 in Omaha, where the Wranglers took the third and final WBL Championship, 99–90.

The team proved popular in Dallas and on one occasion drew a larger playoff game crowd than the then-new NBA franchise, the Dallas Mavericks.

Greg Williams coached both teams. In the 1980–1981 season, the team went 27-9 and he was named WBL Coach of the Year. After working at Southern Methodist University, he was named head coach of the WABA Dallas Diamonds. With his leadership, the team posted a 19-2 record. The team was the league champion and Williams was named WABA Coach of the Year.

=== WABA ===
The WABA folded after a single season with the Diamonds winning the leagues lone championship. The Diamonds record was 19-2.
