= Brogdon =

Brogdon is a surname. Notable people with the surname include:

- Alastair Brogdon (born 1987), English field hockey player
- Cindy Brogdon (born 1957), American women's basketball player
- Connor Brogdon (born 1995), American baseball player
- Malcolm Brogdon (born 1992), American basketball player
- Randy Brogdon (born 1953), American businessman and politician
