= Cindy Brogdon =

American former basketball player

Personal information
- Born: February 25, 1957 (age 69) Buford, Georgia, U.S.
- Listed height: 5 ft 10 in (1.78 m)

Career information
- High school: Greater Atlanta Christian (Norcross, Georgia)
- College: Mercer (1975–1977); Tennessee (1977–1979)
- WBL draft: 1979: 1st round, 2nd overall pick
- Drafted by: California Dreams

Career history
- 1980–1981: New Orleans Pride

Career highlights
- WBL All-Pro second team (1981); WBL All-Star (1981); 3× Kodak All-American (1976, 1978, 1979)
- Stats at Basketball Reference
- Women's Basketball Hall of Fame
Medals
Women's basketball
Representing the United States
Olympic Games
Silver medal – second place	1976 Montreal	Team competition

Cynthia Jane "Cindy" Brogdon (born February 25, 1957) is an American former basketball player who competed in the 1976 Summer Olympics. Brogdon was inducted into the Women's Basketball Hall of Fame in 2002.

== Biography ==
Brogdon was born in Buford, Georgia. She attended Greater Atlanta Christian School (Class of 1975) Mercer University in Georgia in 1976 and 1977, before transferring to the University of Tennessee.

She was the first Georgian to play as a member of a United States Olympic Basketball team, and was inducted into the Georgia Sports Hall of Fame in 1999.

Brogdon was named to the National team to play at the 1976 Olympics, held in Montreal, Quebec, Canada. After losing the opening game to Japan, the USA team beat Bulgaria, but then faced host team Canada. The USA team defeated Canada 84–71. After losing to the USSR, the USA team needed a victory against Czechoslovakia to secure a medal. Brogdon helped the team to an 83–67 win and the silver medal. Brogdon averaged 5.8 points per game.

Brogdon was drafted by the California Dreams in the first round of the Women's Professional Basketball League draft in 1979. She was traded to the New Orleans Pride prior to the season after she had decided to return to school. She played for the Pride during the 1980–81 WBL season where she averaged 14.7 points in 18 games and was named to the WBL All-Pro second team.

She currently works at Northview High School in Johns Creek, Georgia.

=== Mercer and Tennessee statistics ===
Legend
GP	Games played	GS	Games started	MPG	Minutes per game
FG%	Field goal percentage	3P%	3-point field goal percentage	FT%	Free throw percentage
RPG	Rebounds per game	APG	Assists per game	SPG	Steals per game
BPG	Blocks per game	PPG	Points per game	**Bold**	Career high

Year	Team	GP	Points	FG%	3P%	FT%	RPG	APG	SPG	BPG	PPG
1975–76	Mercer	30	**902**	49.3%	0.0%	83.4%	**10.6**	0.0	0.0	0.0	30.1
1976–77	Mercer	28	844	48.6%	0.0%	80.6%	10.2	**4.1**	0.0	0.0	**30.1**
1977–78	Tennessee	33	674	48.2%	0.0%	**86.4%**	7.7	3.6	0.0	0.0	21.7
1978–79	Tennessee	39	784	**49.6%**	0.0%	81.4%	4.7	3.8	0.0	0.0	20.1
Career		128	3204	49.0%	0.0%	82.7%	8.0	2.9	0.0	0.0	25.0
