= Moravia Community School District =

School district in Moravia, Iowa, United States

Coordinates: 40.895943°N 92.819205°W

Location
- Moravia, Iowa Appanoose, Monroe and Davis counties United States
- Coordinates: 40.895943, -92.819205

District information
- Type: Public
- Grades: K–12
- Superintendent: Sam Swenson
- Schools: 2
- Budget: $5,959,000 (2020-21)
- NCES District ID: 1919710

Students and staff
- Students: 382 (2022-23)
- Teachers: 33.32 FTE
- Staff: 36.03 FTE
- Student–teacher ratio: 11.46
- Athletic conference: Bluegrass
- District mascot: Mohawks
- Colors: Blue and White

Other information
- Website: www.moraviaschools.com

The Moravia Community School District is a public school district headquartered northwest of Moravia, Iowa.

The district spans northern Appanoose County and southern Monroe County, with a small area in Davis County. The district serves the towns of Moravia and Unionville, the unincorporated communities of Maine and Iconium, and the surrounding rural areas.

The school's team name is the Mohawks. Their colors are blue and white.

As of 2012, a small school district (142 students in grades 7–12), but growing in recent years.

== Schools ==
The district operates two schools on a single campus in Moravia:

- Moravia Elementary School
- Moravia High School
