= California Dreams (WBL) =

Basketball team in Chicago, Illinois, US

- Division: Western Division
- League: Women's Professional Basketball League
- Founded: 1979
- Folded: 1980
- Arena: Anaheim Convention Center; Long Beach Arena
- Location: Los Angeles, California, U.S.
- Team colors: Orange, Brown, Yellow
- Head coach: Mel Sims
- Ownership: Larry Kozlicki, Terrell Iselhard, Gerald Schenk

The California Dreams was a women's professional basketball team located in Los Angeles, California, United States. It competed in the Women's Professional Basketball League (WBL), the first women's professional basketball league in the United States, from 1979 to 1980. The team struggled financially and with attracting attendance at the Long Beach Arena and folded shortly before the end of its first season.

== Season-by-season record ==
Note: GP = Games played, W = Wins, L = Losses, W–L% = Winning percentage

| Season | GP | W | L | W–L% | Finish | Playoffs |
| 1979–80 | 29 | 11 | 18 | .379 | Folded | N/A |
