= Debbie Brock =

American basketball player

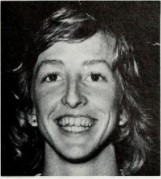
- Brock as a junior at Delta State

Personal information
- Born: July 27, 1956 (age 70) Jackson, Mississippi, U.S.
- Listed height: 4 ft 11 in (1.50 m)

Career information
- High school: Forest Hill (Jackson, Mississippi)
- College: Delta State (1974–1978)
- WBL draft: 1978: 4th round
- Drafted by: Milwaukee Does
- Position: Point guard

Career highlights
- 3× AIAW champion (1975–1977); Kodak All-American (1978); No. 22 retired by Delta State Lady Statesmen
- Stats at Basketball Reference
- Women's Basketball Hall of Fame

Debbie Brock (born July 27, 1956) is an American former collegiate basketball player. During her tenure at Delta State University under coach Margaret Wade, she led the Lady Statesmen to three straight AIAW national titles while maintaining a 120–9 record.

== Early life ==
Brock was born on July 27, 1956, in Jackson, Mississippi to high school basketball coach James N. "Dump" Brock. At the age of nine, she did a half-time performance during her father's basketball games in which she would twirl a basketball and baton at the same time. By the time she reached seventh grade, Brock started playing basketball competitively at junior high and while attending Forest Hill High School. In 1973, Brock received the school's most valuable basketball player award (MVP) and the 1974 All-Little Dixie Conference basketball team MVP. She was also selected as an All-South Mississippi for three consecutive years and All-State during her junior season.

== Collegiate career ==
While there were limited options for women's basketball programs in college, Brock was approached by coach Margaret Wade at Delta State University to enrol at their school. When reflecting on her decision, Brock said that she was convinced to play for the Lady Statesmen due to their basketball program and her father's wish for her to play under coach Wade. Prior to her first game as a freshman, Brock was praised by her coach as being the team's smartest and quickest player in spite of standing under five feet tall. However, during the season she suffered a pinched nerve in her left knee which slowed her game throughout the year, causing her to be replaced by freshman Pam Piazza. In spite of this, Brock received DSU's Best Defensive Player Award and Best Freethrow Award at the conclusion of her freshman season.

In her sophomore year, Brock helped lead the Lady Statesmen to their second consecutive AIAW national title. During the opening game of the tournament, Brock scored 19-of-21 free throws to lead the team to an overtime win over Federal City. In the semifinal game against Wayland Baptist of Texas, she sank two free throws with five seconds left in the game to beat Wayland 61–60. Following this, she helped the team overcome a deficit by recording 17 points, including eight free throws in the last three minutes, to beat Immaculata College in the Finals. Coach Wade stated that "Brock saved us" and a rival player said they would bring "a fly swatter next time", in reference to Brock's height. As a result, she was voted Most Valuable Player of the tournament and received the school's Best Defensive Player Award for the second time.

During the 1976–1977 season, Brock continued her defensive game while leading the team to their third straight AIAW National Tournament with a 27–3 record. She averaged 7.6 points and rebounds a game while also leading the team in freethrows with 84.4 percent. As the Lady Statesmen vied for their third title at the 1977 Championship, Brock recorded 22 points against the LSU Lady Tigers while never turning the ball over.

At the conclusion of her senior year, Brock led the Lady Statesmen to three straight AIAW national titles while maintaining a 120–9 record. She recorded a total of 903 career points and 474 assists, ranking 9th overall in DSU history, and was honored by DSU with the retirement of her jersey number. On April 22, 1978, Governor Cliff Finch proclaimed the day be named in honor of her collegiate achievements. Brock also became the fourth straight Lady Statesmen to be named to the Kodak All-America basketball team. Upon graduating with a degree in childhood education, Brock began coaching at Monterey High School, although she originally had no intention of coaching after college.

=== Honors and awards post college ===
In 1988, Brock was inducted into the Delta State Sports Hall of Fame alongside three of her teammates from the 1975–77 national championship Lady Statesmen teams. In 2013, Brock was recognized as an Association for Intercollegiate Athletics for Women Great Player at the NCAA Division 1 Women's Final Four. Brock later became the third Lady Statesmen basketball player to be inducted into the Women's Basketball Hall of Fame, a ceremony which was postponed due to the COVID-19 pandemic.
