= New Jersey Gems =

- League: WBL
- Founded: 1978
- Dissolved: 1981
- Arena: Thomas Dunn Center (1978–1980); South Mountain Arena (1980–81)
- Location: Elizabeth, New Jersey (1978–1980); West Orange, New Jersey (1980–81)
- Team colors: blue, orange, white

The New Jersey Gems was a franchise that played in the Women's Professional Basketball League (WBL), one of only three teams in the league to survive through all three seasons, from 1978–79 to 1980–81. The team made the league playoffs once, losing in the first round. The team played its first two seasons at the Thomas Dunn Center in Elizabeth, New Jersey and at the South Mountain Arena in West Orange, New Jersey in the league's third and final season.

== History ==
The league began with a player draft held in Manhattan's Essex House in July 1978, with eight teams participating. New Jersey selected Carol Blazejowski from Montclair State College, but announced while on tour in Bulgaria with the U.S. national women's team through her coach Maureen Wendelken that she had no intention of playing professionally and that her goal was to retain her amateur standing to be able to play for the U.S. at the 1980 Summer Olympics.

The Gems finished the 1978–79 season with a record of 9 wins and 25 losses, placing fourth in the Eastern Division and giving it the league's worst record in its debut season. Ann Meyers, top pick by the Houston Angels in the WBL's initial draft in 1978 sat out the first season. In a November 1979 news conference held at Giants Stadium, Meyer's agent announced that Meyers would sign a three-year contract with the Gems, with the $50,000 for the first year matching the amount she had been paid by the Indiana Pacers in a bid to become the first woman to play in the NBA. That year, Meyers shared Most Valuable Player honors with Molly Bolin of the Iowa Cornets. New Jersey had a 19–17 record in the 1979–80 season, placing third in the Eastern Division. While the team had a better record than the San Francisco Pioneers, which did make it into the playoffs as the second-best team in the Western Division, only two teams from each division were eligible.

For the 1980–81 season, Meyers left the club over non-payment of wages. However, the team added Carol Blazejowski, who signed a $150,000 three-year deal, as well as by Tara Heiss of the University of Maryland and twins Faye and Kaye Young. In the 1980–81 season. New Jersey completed the season with a record of 23 wins and 13 losses, placing second in the Coastal Division. In the first round of the playoffs, the Gems played the division-leading Dallas Diamonds. The Gems won the first game of the series 91–86, but were swept by Dallas by scores of 92–85 and 107–88 in the final two games.

== See also ==
- New Jersey Jammers
- New Jersey Meteors
- New Jersey ShoreCats
