= 1980 Olympics =

The 1980 Olympics may refer to:

- 1980 Winter Olympics, Lake Placid, New York, United States
- 1980 Summer Olympics, Moscow, Russian SFSR, Soviet Union
