= Iowa Cornets =

- League: WBL
- Founded: 1978
- Dissolved: 1980
- Arena: Veterans Memorial Auditorium (1978–1980); Five Seasons Center (1980–81)
- Location: Cedar Rapids, Iowa
- Team colors: green, white
- Division titles: 1 (1980)

The Iowa Cornets was a team that played for two seasons in the Women's Professional Basketball League. George Nissen purchased the first franchise in the fledgling league on March 21, 1978 for $50,000. Nissen, who had been a star gymnast at the University of Iowa in the 1930s, pioneered the manufacture and sale of the modern trampoline at his Griswold-Nissen Trampoline & Tumbling Co. in Cedar Rapids. The team made it to the league's championship series both seasons, falling to the Houston Angels in 1978-79 and to the New York Stars in 1979–80. The team played their games at the Veterans Memorial Auditorium in Des Moines, Iowa and at the Five Seasons Center in Cedar Rapids, Iowa.

== History ==
The league began with a player draft held in Manhattan's Essex House in July 1978, with eight teams participating. By the time of the draft, Iowa was one of only three teams that had a nickname selected and the only team that had already engaged a coach. With its last pick in the draft, the Cornets selected Uljana Semjonova, a 7-foot-4-inch player for the Soviet Union's national women's basketball team who would be inducted as an inaugural member of the Women's Basketball Hall of Fame in the class of 1999, but would never play a game in the WBL. Molly Bolin, who grew up in Moravia, Iowa, became the first player signed by any team in the WBL when she was signed by the Cornets. The team's first game on December 18, 1976 against the New York Stars at Veterans Memorial Auditorium was broadcast on television by Iowa Public Broadcasting Network.

The team finished the 1978–79 season with a record of 21 wins and 13 losses, tied for the Midwest Division lead with the Chicago Hustle. In the first round of the playoffs, Chicago took the first game in overtime, but Iowa won the last two games to advance to the championship series against the Houston Angels. Houston won the first two games of the series by scores of 89–85 and 112–98. Iowa won the next two games by scores of 110–101 and 89–79 to tie the series at two games apiece and setting up a fifth and final game for the title. Behind 36 points by Paula Mayo, the Houston Angels defeated the Cornets on May 2, 1979, to take the league's first championship, 111–104 in the fifth and final game of a best-three-out-of-five competition.

In the 1979–80 season, Iowa finished atop the Midwestern Division with a record of 24 wins and 12 losses, and as one of the two teams with the league's best record earned a bye in the first round. In the semifinals, Iowa played defeated the Minnesota Fillies, losing the first game 108–87, but winning the next two games by scores of 128–111 and 95–92 to advance to the league championship for their second consecutive season. On April 9, 1980, despite Iowa's league-leading scorer Molly Bolin's 36 point, the New York Stars held on to win game four of the finals 125–114, behind 27 points by Pearl Moore and 22 by Janice Thomas. Molly Bolin of the Cornets and Ann Meyers of the New Jersey Gems were co-winners of the Most Valuable Player title for the 1979–80 season.

The team was disbanded after the 1979–80 season.
