= Molly Bolin =

American basketball player

Personal information
- Born: November 13, 1957 (age 69) Dryden, Ontario, Canada
- Listed height: 5 ft 9 in (1.75 m)

Career information
- High school: Moravia (Moravia, Iowa)
- College: Grand View
- Playing career: 1978–1984

Career history

Playing
- 1978–1980: Iowa Cornets
- 1980: Southern California Breeze
- 1980–1981: San Francisco Pioneers
- 1984: Columbus Minks

Coaching
- 1980: Southern California Breeze (assistant)

Career highlights
- As player: WBL Co-MVP (1980); 3× WBL All-Star (1979–1981); WBL scoring leader (1980)

Career WBL statistics
- Points: 2,479 (25.6 ppg)
- Games: 97
- Stats at Basketball Reference

"Machine Gun" Molly Bolin (born Monna Lea Van Benthuysen; November 13, 1957) is an American former basketball player. Following a college career at Grand View University, she went on to star at the first women's professional basketball league in the United States, the Women's Professional Basketball League (WBL). Bolin, who was the first player signed with a team in the WBL, became a pioneering figure in women's basketball, both as a formidable scoring threat and as a sex symbol of the league. Among her accolades, Bolin holds the Women's Professional Basketball League record for the most points scored in a single game (55) and the highest single-season scoring average (32.8).

== Biography ==
=== Early life ===
Bolin was born in Dryden, Ontario, the fifth of six children born to Forrest and Wanda Van Benthuysen. She was raised in Moravia, Iowa, where she first began playing basketball for Moravia High School's Mohawks during her junior year. In six-player half-court gameplay, Bolin averaged 50 points in her first year and 54.8 points in her senior year, while setting the school's single-game record for most points by one player with 83 points in January 1975. Among other early accolades, Bolin was selected to participate in tryouts for 1976 Summer Olympics' women's basketball team at 17 years-old and was voted an All-American in her senior year.

=== College career ===
In 1975, Bolin began attending Grand View University in Des Moines, Iowa where she had to adjust to the conventional five-player style of play with the Vikings basketball team. As she recollected, "College wasn't the same experience as high school and I had to learn the five-on-five full-court game pretty quickly. In fact, right out of high school in 1975, I got recruited to tryout for the '75 Pan American team and I couldn't even dribble full-court and make a basket". Instead of playing her sophomore year, Bolin decided to sit out to marry Dennis Bolin and give birth to the couple's child, Damien, in 1977. When Bolin returned to the court in 1978, she set university scoring records, averaging 24.6 points per game, and graduated with an associate's degree in telecommunications.

=== Professional career ===
After her second year of eligibility, Bolin became the first player to sign to the newly-formed Women's Professional Basketball League, when she signed a one-year contract with the Iowa Cornets for $6,000. Honing in on her appearance as a blonde bombshell, Bolin was situated as the sex symbol of the league, appearing in several photo shoots, features in Sports Illustrated and SportsWorld, and commercials with NBA players such as Larry Bird. Nicknamed "Machine Gun" by a columnist of the Washington Post for her prolific scoring ability, Bolin averaged 16.7 points per game, and helped advance the Cornets to the championship finals before they were defeated by the Houston Angels. During the 1979-80 season, Bolin set 12 WBL records, including most points scored in a single game (55) and the highest single-season scoring average (32.8), and was named co-MVP alongside Ann Meyers. Despite posting a 36-point game, the Cornets were beaten again in the finals, this time losing to the New York Stars. That summer she coached girls' basketball at a camp in Cedar Rapids with teammates Connie Kunzmann, Tanya Crevier and Nancy Wellen.

With the WBL financially struggling, long road-trips, and low pay, Bolin agreed to join the Ladies Professional Basketball Association, a Southwestern-based league that was established to compete with the faltering WBL, as a player and assistant coach. However, after just seven games with the Southern California Breeze, the LPBA disbanded, and Bolin—a high-list free agent sought after by all the eight remaining WBL teams—negotiated a contract with the San Francisco Pioneers, whose coach, former NBA player Dean Meminger, was a crucial selling point for Bolin. Under Meminger's mentorship, she finished the 1980-1981 season second in the league in scoring (26.8) and competed in her third All-Star game. The WBL's third season proved to be its last for the league was forced to dissolve under severe financial hardship.

After the WBL folded, Bolin was engaged in a custody battle with her recently divorced husband over their son, Damien. Initially, the court awarded her ex-spouse full custody, arguing that Bolin's profession and her glamour shoots made her an unfit parent; however, the decision was appealed and overturned in 1983. In 1984, Bolin was selected for a USA All-Star team composed of former olympians and professional players to participate in exhibition games against the 1984 Summer Olympics women's team which eventually won the gold medal. Bolin played her last professional season in the same year, signing with the Columbus Minks of the short-lived Women's American Basketball Association.

=== Later life ===
Following her playing career, Bolin continued to promote the concept of a new women's basketball league, and was hired by Fox Sports in 1995 to create a women's tournament for television. Shortly after Bolin's contributions, the NBA announced its intent to establish the Women's National Basketball Association. Other post-basketball accolades include her induction in the Iowa High School Basketball Hall of Fame in 1986, and the Grandview College Athletic Hall of Fame in 1999.

Bolin married to John Kazmer in 1989, and they currently reside in La Quinta, California with their two children.
