= Moravia, Iowa =

- City

- Location of Moravia, Iowa
- Coordinates: 40°53′31″N 92°49′07″W
- Country: United States
- State: Iowa
- County: Appanoose

Area
  - Total: 1.18 sq mi (3.05 km^{2})
  - Land: 1.18 sq mi (3.05 km^{2})
  - Water: 0 sq mi (0.00 km^{2})
- Elevation: 994 ft (303 m)

Population (2020)
  - Total: 637
  - Density: 541.7/sq mi (209.16/km^{2})
- Time zone: UTC-6 (Central (CST))
  - Summer (DST): UTC-5 (CDT)
- ZIP code: 52571
- Area code: 641
- FIPS code: 19-53985
- GNIS feature ID: 2395398
- Website: moraviaiowa.com

Moravia is a city in Appanoose County, Iowa, United States. The population was 637 at the time of the 2020 census.

== History ==
Moravia is named for the religious faith. Moravian families left Salem, North Carolina, in 1849 to start a colony in the west. Money was sent to purchase forty acres of land for a town site by several benevolent Moravian sisters. It was their wish that town lots be sold and the money be used to build a Moravian Church. The families made the long journey to Iowa and acquired many acres of land.

The town site of Moravia was laid out on June 27, 1850 and was recorded July 15, 1851. The surveying was done using a pocket compass and tapeline for measuring instruments. The old ridge road from Unionville, Iowa, to Moravia and west to Iconium, Iowa, supplied part of the Mormon Trail of 1846 from Nauvoo, Illinois, to Salt Lake City, Utah.

=== Moravia station ===
- Wabash Combination Depot-Moravia
- U.S. National Register of Historic Places
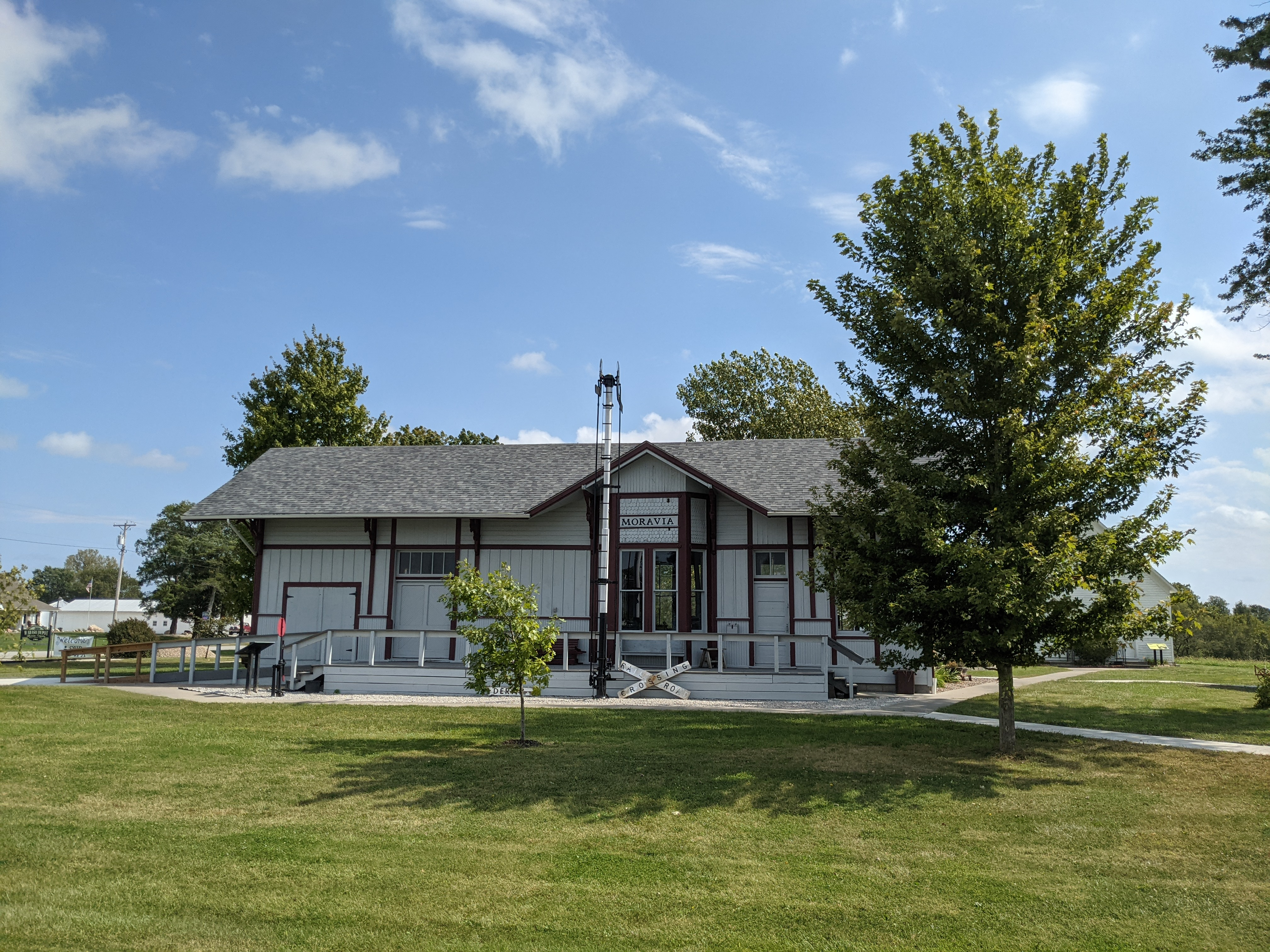
- Location: W. North St. near its junction with Brandon St., Moravia, Iowa
- Area: less than one acre
- Built: 1903
- Architect: Wabash Railroad
- Architectural style: Queen Anne
- MPS: Advent & Development of Railroads in Iowa MPS
- NRHP reference No.: 96001158
- Added to NRHP: October 18, 1996

Moravia station, now known as the Wabash Depot Museum, is an historic train station that served the Wabash Railroad. It was completed in 1903 and is one of the last remaining standard-plan wooden Wabash combination freight and passenger depots still standing in Iowa. The Queen Anne style building is an example of the rural combination station plan, combining all passenger and freight railroad services in one building.

In 1975, the building was donated to the Moravia Historical Society and converted into a museum. The Wabash Depot Museum features various railroad artifacts, an operational model train layout, and a restored railroad section car. The building was listed on the National Register of Historic Places in 1999 as a part of the Advent & Development of Railroads in Iowa MPS.

== Geography ==
According to the United States Census Bureau, the city has a total area of 1.12 square miles (2.90 km^{2}), all land.

== Demographics ==
Historical populations
Year	Pop.	±%
1860	172	—
1870	161	−6.4%
1880	173	+7.5%
1890	311	+79.8%
1900	632	+103.2%
1910	682	+7.9%
1920	837	+22.7%
1930	684	−18.3%
1940	731	+6.9%
1950	652	−10.8%
1960	621	−4.8%
1970	699	+12.6%
1980	706	+1.0%
1990	679	−3.8%
2000	713	+5.0%
2010	665	−6.7%
2020	637	−4.2%
Source:"U.S. Census website". United States Census Bureau. and Iowa Data Center; Source: U.S. Decennial Census

=== 2020 census ===
As of the census of 2020, there were 637 people, 297 households, and 165 families residing in the city. The population density was 546.4 inhabitants per square mile (211.0/km^{2}). There were 314 housing units at an average density of 269.4 per square mile (104.0/km^{2}). The racial makeup of the city was 96.1% White, 0.0% Black or African American, 0.0% Native American, 0.3% Asian, 0.2% Pacific Islander, 0.0% from other races and 3.5% from two or more races. Hispanic or Latino persons of any race comprised 0.9% of the population.

Of the 297 households, 29.0% of which had children under the age of 18 living with them, 39.4% were married couples living together, 6.7% were cohabitating couples, 38.4% had a female householder with no spouse or partner present and 15.5% had a male householder with no spouse or partner present. 44.4% of all households were non-families. 39.7% of all households were made up of individuals, 21.2% had someone living alone who was 65 years old or older.

The median age in the city was 39.4 years. 27.2% of the residents were under the age of 20; 4.6% were between the ages of 20 and 24; 25.1% were from 25 and 44; 19.5% were from 45 and 64; and 23.7% were 65 years of age or older. The gender makeup of the city was 45.5% male and 54.5% female.

=== 2010 census ===
As of the census of 2010, there were 665 people, 301 households, and 176 families residing in the city. The population density was 593.8 inhabitants per square mile (229.3/km^{2}). There were 325 housing units at an average density of 290.2 per square mile (112.0/km^{2}). The racial makeup of the city was 98.5% White, 0.2% Native American, 0.2% Asian, and 1.2% from two or more races. Hispanic or Latino of any race were 1.2% of the population.

There were 301 households, of which 26.2% had children under the age of 18 living with them, 41.9% were married couples living together, 12.6% had a female householder with no husband present, 4.0% had a male householder with no wife present, and 41.5% were non-families. 36.5% of all households were made up of individuals, and 19.6% had someone living alone who was 65 years of age or older. The average household size was 2.21 and the average family size was 2.89.

The median age in the city was 42.1 years. 24.4% of residents were under the age of 18; 6.7% were between the ages of 18 and 24; 21.6% were from 25 to 44; 26.3% were from 45 to 64; and 21.1% were 65 years of age or older. The gender makeup of the city was 47.7% male and 52.3% female.

=== 2000 census ===
As of the census of 2000, there were 713 people, 317 households, and 206 families residing in the city. The population density was 615.8 inhabitants per square mile (237.8/km^{2}). There were 332 housing units at an average density of 286.7 per square mile (110.7/km^{2}). The racial makeup of the city was 99.02% White, and 0.98% from two or more races. Hispanic or Latino of any race were 0.14% of the population.

There were 317 households, out of which 27.4% had children under the age of 18 living with them, 49.5% were married couples living together, 11.4% had a female householder with no husband present, and 35.0% were non-families. 31.9% of all households were made up of individuals, and 20.8% had someone living alone who was 65 years of age or older. The average household size was 2.25 and the average family size was 2.79.

Age spread: 23.3% under the age of 18, 9.5% from 18 to 24, 21.2% from 25 to 44, 22.7% from 45 to 64, and 23.3% who were 65 years of age or older. The median age was 42 years. For every 100 females, there were 84.7 males. For every 100 females age 18 and over, there were 79.3 males.

The median income for a household in the city was $26,042, and the median income for a family was $29,231. Males had a median income of $26,250 versus $17,212 for females. The per capita income for the city was $15,821. About 7.6% of families and 13.8% of the population were below the poverty line, including 18.7% of those under age 18 and 16.0% of those age 65 or over.

== Notable person(s) ==
- Molly Bolin Kazmer: professional women's basketball player with the Iowa Cornets

== See also ==
- Wabash Combination Depot-Moravia, known as the Wabash Railroad Museum, is listed on the National Register of Historic Places
- Moravia (Town), Cayuga County, New York

Preceding station	Wabash Railroad	Following station
Selection toward Des Moines	Des Moines – Moberly	Hiattsville toward Moberly
