= Houston Angels =

- League: WBL
- Founded: 1978
- Dissolved: 1980
- Arena: Astro Arena
- Team colors: blue, white
- Head coach: Don Knodel
- Ownership: Hugh Sweeney
- Championships: 1 (1979)
- Division titles: 2 (1979, 1980)

The Houston Angels was a team that played for two seasons in the Women's Professional Basketball League. The team won the league championship in the inaugural season defeating the Iowa Cornets three games to two in the best-of-five tournament. The team played their games at the Astro Arena.

The league began with a player draft held in Manhattan's Essex House in July 1978, with eight teams participating. Houston drafted Ann Meyers from the University of California, Los Angeles and Lusia Harris, a collegiate standout at Delta State University. Harris was reluctant to commit to playing after hearing the $3,000 to $5,000 salaries estimated by the Minnesota franchise and decided to sit out the 1978-79 season and retain her administrative position at Delta State.

The team had an all-male cheerleading squad called the Guardian Angels, which team owner Hugh Sweeney promised wouldn't be a "sex show - this is high class".

Houston finished the 1978-79 regular season with a league-best record of 26 wins and 8 losses, taking first place in the eastern Division. Houston defeated the second-place New York Stars two games to none in the best two-out-of-three semifinal round, winning the final game of the series by a score of 93–84 despite a game-high 38 points by Althea Gwyn of the Stars. Houston won the first two games of the series by scores of 89–85 and 112–98. Iowa won the next two games by scores of 110–101 and 89–79 to tie the series at two games apiece and setting up a fifth and final game for the title. Behind 36 points by Paula Mayo, the Angels defeated the Iowa Cornets on May 2, 1979, to take the league's first championship, 111-104 in the fifth and final game of a best-three-out-of-five competition. Don Knodel was honored as WBL Coach of the Year for the 1978-79 season.

The Angels were shifted to the Western Division for the 1979-80 season and finished atop the division with a record of 19 wins and 14 losses. In the quarterfinal round of the playoffs, Houston was knocked off two games to one by the San Francisco Pioneers.

The team was disbanded after the 1979-80 season.
