= Philadelphia Fox =

- League: WBL (1979–1980)
- Founded: 1979
- Dissolved: 1979
- Arena: Philadelphia Civic Center
- Location: Philadelphia (1979)
- Team colors: Gray, Orange & White
- Ownership: Eric Kraus

The Philadelphia Fox was a basketball team that played in the Women's Professional Basketball League (WBL), the first women's pro league in the United States. Owned by Eric Kraus, it was added as an expansion team prior to the WBL's second season, with former NBA player Dave Wohl serving as head coach and general manager.

Faced with financial difficulties from the beginning, the league revoked Kraus' ownership on December 1, 1979, and took over the team. Unable to finance the team, the WBL announced the shutdown of the team on December 21st, 1979.

== Season-by-season record ==
Note: GP = Games played, W = Wins, L = Losses, W–L% = Winning percentage

Season	GP	W	L	W–L%	Finish	Playoffs
1979–80	10	2	8	.200	6th, Eastern	Did not qualify

== Head coaches ==
- Dave Wohl 1979
