= Ann Meyers =

American basketball player and sportscaster

Ann Meyers Drysdale
Personal information
- Born: March 26, 1955 (age 71) San Diego, California, U.S.
- Listed height: 5 ft 9 in (1.75 m)
- Listed weight: 134 lb (61 kg)

Career information
- High school: Sonora (La Habra, California)
- College: UCLA (1974–1978)
- WBL draft: 1978: 1st round, 1st overall pick
- Drafted by: Houston Angels
- Playing career: 1978–1981
- Position: Shooting guard
- Number: 15

Career history
- 1979–1981: New Jersey Gems

Career highlights
- WBL Co-MVP (1980); Broderick Cup (1978); Honda Sports Award for basketball (1978); 4× Kodak All-American (1975–1978)
- Stats at Basketball Reference
- Basketball Hall of Fame
- Women's Basketball Hall of Fame
- FIBA Hall of Fame
Medals
Women's Basketball
Representing the United States
Pan American Games
| Gold medal – first place | 1975 Mexico City | National team |
| Silver medal – second place | 1979 San Juan | National team |
Olympic Games
| Silver medal – second place | 1976 Montreal | Team competition |
World University Games
| Silver medal – second place | 1977 Sofia | National team |
World Championship
| Gold medal – first place | 1979 Seoul | National team |
Jones Cup
| Gold medal – first place | 1979 Taipei | Team competition |

Ann Meyers Drysdale (born Ann Elizabeth Meyers; March 26, 1955) is an American retired basketball player and a sportscaster. She was a standout player in high school, college, the Olympic Games, international tournaments, and at professional levels.

Meyers was the first player to be part of the U.S. national team while still in high school. She was the first woman signed to a four-year college athletic scholarship, at UCLA. She was also the first woman to sign a contract with a National Basketball Association team (the Indiana Pacers), in 1979.

Meyers was president and general manager for the WNBA's Phoenix Mercury and a vice president for the NBA's Phoenix Suns. She is a vice president for the Phoenix Mercury and a color analyst for the Phoenix Suns television broadcasts. For over 26 years, she served as a network television sports analyst for TNT, ESPN, CBS, and NBC. Meyers is a board member for the Lott IMPACT Trophy, which is named after Pro Football Hall of Fame defensive back Ronnie Lott, and is given annually to college football's Defensive IMPACT Player of the Year. In 1993, Meyers was one of the first women players inducted into the Basketball Hall of Fame, and in the inaugural class at the Women's Basketball Hall of Fame in 1999. She was inducted into the FIBA Hall of Fame in 2007 and into the National Polish-American Sports Hall of Fame in 2016.

== Early life ==
Meyers was born on March 26, 1955, the sixth of Patricia and Bob Meyers' 11 children. Her father played guard for Marquette University, then for the Shooting Stars, a professional team in Milwaukee, Wisconsin. One of her brothers, Dave, was an All-American at UCLA and went on to play for the Milwaukee Bucks.

== Athletic accomplishments ==
=== High school ===
Meyers attended Cornelia Connelly High School and then later Sonora High School in La Habra, California, where she was able to engage in more competitive play. As an all-around athlete, she lettered in seven sports, including in softball, badminton, field hockey, tennis, and basketball. She earned thirteen Most Valuable Player awards in high school sports. She led her basketball teams to an 80–5 record. In 1974, Meyers became the first high school student to play for the U.S. national team.

=== College ===
Meyers was a four-year athletic scholarship player for the UCLA Bruins women's basketball team (1974–1978), the first woman to be so honored at any university. In a game against Stephen F. Austin on February 18, 1978, she recorded the first quadruple-double in NCAA Division I basketball history, with 20 points, 14 rebounds, 10 assists and 10 steals. Since then, only four Division I players, three female and one male, have done so. On March 25, 1978, her UCLA Bruins team was the AIAW national champion: UCLA defeated Maryland, 90–74 at Pauley Pavilion. While at UCLA (1976–1979), she became the first four-time All-American women's basketball player. She was the winner of the Honda Sports Award as outstanding women's college basketball player of the year, as well as the Broderick Cup for outstanding woman athlete of the year in 1978. As of 2008, she still holds UCLA career records for season steals (125), career steals (403), and career blocked shots (101).

UCLA statistics Source:

Ann Meyers NCAA statistics
| Year | Team | GP | Points | FG% | FT% | RPG | APG | SPG | BPG | PPG |
|---|---|---|---|---|---|---|---|---|---|---|
| 1974–75 | UCLA | 23 | 422 | .528 | .767 | 8.3 | 5.4 | 5.2 | 1.1 | 18.3 |
| 1975–76 | UCLA | 23 | 323 | .426 | .730 | 8.2 | 5.6 | 3.6 | 0.7 | 14.0 |
| 1976–77 | UCLA | 22 | 402 | .505 | .828 | 7.3 | 5.0 | 3.5 | 1.3 | 18.3 |
| 1977–78 | UCLA | 29 | 538 | .526 | .800 | 9.6 | 6.3 | 4.3 | 1.1 | 18.6 |
| Career | | 97 | 1,685 | .500 | .785 | 8.4 | 5.6 | 4.2 | 1.0 | 17.4 |

=== Olympics and world competition ===
Meyers was a member of the US team that won the 1975 Pan American Games Gold medal. She played on the US Olympic basketball team that won a silver medal in the 1976 Summer Olympics in Montreal. That team was led by Billie Moore, her own coach at UCLA. She was on the 1979 US team that won the 1979 FIBA World Championship for Women Gold medal. This was the first time since 1957 that the United States won a World Championship title. She also won silver medals at the 1979 Pan American Games and 1977 World University Games.

Meyers was named to the team representing the US at the 1979 William Jones Cup competition in Taipei, Taiwan. The USA team won all six games en route to the gold medal.

=== Professional ===
In July 1978, Meyers was selected first overall by the Houston Angels in the inaugural Women's Professional Basketball League draft. She decided against signing with the Angels to keep her amateur status and be eligible for the 1980 Olympics.

In 1979, Meyers made NBA history when she signed a $50,000 no-cut contract with NBA's Indiana Pacers. She participated in three-day tryouts for the team, the first by any woman for the NBA, but eventually was not chosen for the final squad. She became a color analyst for the team at a time when there were very few women in sportscasting.

After her stint with the Pacers, Meyers finally joined the WBL and signed with the New Jersey Gems. Playing for the Gems, Meyers was the WPBL Co-MVP for the 1979–1980 season. She wore jersey No. 15 for the Gems.

== Superstars ==
Meyers entered the inaugural Women Superstars competition in 1979, finishing fourth, but then went on to win the next three consecutive years: 1980, 1981, and 1982.

== Broadcasting career ==
Meyers has been the women's basketball analyst at the Summer Olympics since the NBC's coverage of the 2000 Sydney Olympics for NBC Sports. She was offered a job to broadcast the Chicago Bulls games in 1993 although turned it down due to family considerations.

She served as an analyst on ESPN's coverage of the WNBA and previously worked for NBC Sports full-time as its lead WNBA analyst from 1997 to 2002. Meyers also worked "Hoop-It-Up" telecasts in 1994 and 1995. Since 1983, she has served as an ESPN analyst for various events including both men's and women's NCAA basketball games.

She also worked as a color analyst for the Indiana Pacers making her the first woman to do game analysis for the team. In 2012, she joined the Phoenix Suns broadcast team as a color analyst. On July 11, 2018, she announced her retirement from the Suns.

Meyers led the U.S. to a silver medal at the 1976 Olympic Games in Montreal as women's basketball made its Olympic debut, and returned eight years later as an announcer for ABC Sports at the 1984 Summer Olympics in Los Angeles. She has since covered a wide variety of sports for major networks in the U.S., including the 1986, 1990 and 1994 Goodwill Games, men's and women's college basketball, and NCAA softball and volleyball.

Meyers served as an analyst for NBC Sports coverage of women's basketball at the 2008, 2012 and 2016 Summer Olympics.

== Personal life ==
On November 1, 1986, she married former Los Angeles Dodger Baseball Hall of Fame pitcher Don Drysdale, and took the name Ann Meyers Drysdale. It was the first time where a married couple were members of their respective sports' Halls of Fame. They met for the first time at The Superstars set in 1979 where Ann was competing and Don was an announcer. They had three children: sons Don Jr. (DJ) and Darren, and daughter Drew.

Meyers was widowed on July 3, 1993, when Drysdale died of a heart attack in Montreal, Quebec, Canada.

Meyers is the sister of former NBA player Dave Meyers, who also played college basketball and was an All-American at UCLA, under coach John Wooden. He played four seasons for the NBA's Milwaukee Bucks.

Previously a resident of Rancho Mirage, California, Meyers resides in Huntington Beach, California.

== Honors and Hall of Fame inductions ==
- 1978—Winner of the Honda award for basketball
- 1978—The Honda-Broderick Cup winner for all sports.
- Meyers received her first Hall of Fame membership in 1985, when she was inducted into the International Women's Sports Hall of Fame in the contemporary category for basketball.
- She was inducted into the UCLA Athletics Hall of Fame in 1988 as the first woman inductee.
- Her No. 15 basketball jersey was one of the first four retired by UCLA. She was honored on February 3, 1990, in a ceremony in Pauley Pavilion, along with Denise Curry (#12), Kareem Abdul-Jabbar (#33), and Bill Walton (#32). This was the key moment in the "Pauley at 25" celebration of twenty-five years of the arena. The primary criteria for being chosen was that all four players were three-time All-Americans.
- On May 10, 1993, she was enshrined in the Naismith Memorial Basketball Hall of Fame, located in Springfield, Massachusetts.
- When she was elected to the Naismith Basketball Hall of Fame in 1993, it was the first time where a married couple were members of their respective Halls of Fame.
- In 1994, Meyers was the first woman ever to compete in the Celebrity Golf Association Championship.
- On January 31, 1995, she attended a ceremony in the gym of her high school, Sonora High School, in La Habra, California, where her player jersey was officially retired, and hung in display
- She was inducted into the National High School Hall of Fame in 1995.
- In 1999, Meyers received the Mel Greenberg Media Award, presented by the WBCA.
- On June 5, 1999, she was inducted as a charter member of the Women's Basketball Hall of Fame, in Knoxville, Tennessee.
- In 2001, Meyers was honored as a Wooden All-Time All-American by the Wooden award.
- She was a 2003 NCAA Silver Anniversary Awards recipient. She joins William Naulls (1981), Kareem Abdul-Jabbar (1994), and Bill Walton (1999) as UCLA athletes who have been so honored on the 25th anniversary of a major athletic accomplishment.
- In 2007, she was enshrined in the FIBA Hall of Fame as part of the inaugural class of 2007. She is 1 of 3 United States citizens, along with male player Bill Russell and coach Dean Smith so honored.
- In 2025, she was part of the first group of inductees of the Huntington Beach Sports Hall of Fame.
- Ann has been involved with Special Olympics for more than 30 years and currently serves as a Sports Ambassador for Special Olympics Southern California.

== See also ==
- List of Silver Anniversary Awards (NCAA) Recipients
- UCLA Bruins women's basketball
- Manon Rhéaume, the first woman to play in a game in the major professional sports leagues in the United States and Canada

== Notes ==
=== Book sources ===
- Woolum, Janet (1998). Outstanding Women Athletes: Who They Are and How They Influenced Sports In America. Oryx Press. ISBN 978-1-57356-120-4.
- David L. Porter, ed. (2005). Basketball: A Biographical Dictionary. Greenwood Press. ISBN 978-0-313-30952-6.
