= New York Stars (WBL) =

- Division: Eastern Division (1978–1980)
- League: Women's Professional Basketball League
- Founded: 1978
- Folded: 1980
- History: New York Stars; 1978–1980
- Arena: Mulcahy Center (1978–1979); Madison Square Garden (1979–1980)
- Location: New York, NY
- Team colors: Royal blue, silver, white
- Championships: 1 (1980)
- Division titles: 1 (1980)

The New York Stars were an American professional basketball team that played for the first two of three seasons in the Women's Professional Basketball League. The team won the 1979–80 league championship in its second season, defeating the Iowa Cornets.

== History ==
=== 1978–79 season ===
The WBL began with a player draft held in Manhattan's Essex House in July 1978, with eight teams participating. The Stars drafted Althea Gwyn and Debbie "The Pearl" Mason, who had played collegiate basketball locally at Queens College. The team played the inaugural season at the Mulcahy Center in New Rochelle, New York and its second season at Madison Square Garden. Twins Faye and Kaye Young, who had played together at both Peace College and North Carolina State University, were reunited for both seasons that the Stars were in existence.

In end of January, the Stars fired head coach Alan Cissorsky and later hired LaVozier LaMar in his place, with Donna Geils serving as an interim coach in between.

The team finished the 1978–79 season with a record of 19 wins and 15 losses, placing second of four teams in the league's Eastern Division. In the first round of the playoffs the Stars were swept in two games by the Houston Angels, who would go on to win the first league championship. The Stars lost the final game against the Angels by a score of 93–84, despite 38 points from Althea Gwyn.

=== 1979–80 season ===
Prior to the 1979–80 season, the Stars announced that Dean Meminger, a former player for the New York Knicks, would take over as head coach. The announcement was met with some derision by the press, who dismissed the still-nascent league. The New York Daily News wrote their surprise that a high-profile male athlete like Meminger would choose to coach a women's team. Gail Marquis, who had played for the USA Basketball National Team in the 1976 Olympics, was selected to join the Stars for the season.

In the 1979–80 season the team finished with a record of 28 wins and seven losses, the highest winning percentage of any team in league history. The Stars finished in first place in the six-team Eastern Division (though two teams, the Washington Metros and the Philadelphia Fox, had disbanded after 10 games). The Stars earned a bye in the first round and played the San Francisco Pioneers in the semifinals, sweeping the series in two games. On April 9, 1980, the New York Stars won game four of the finals 125–114, despite Iowa's league-leading scorer Molly Bolin's 36 points. Stars player Pearl Moore earned 27 points during the game, and Janice Thomas earned 22. Meminger called the game the "culmination of a year of hard work," and was honored as the league's Coach of the Year.

As it turned out, that game would be the last one the Stars ever played. Despite their strong season, the Stars were on shaky financial ground. They asked to go inactive for two years in order to rebuild their fortunes. However, this came undone when the league collapsed after the 1980–81 season.

== Season-by-season record ==
Note: GP = Games played, W = Wins, L = Losses, W–L% = Winning percentage

Season	GP	W	L	W–L%	Finish	Playoffs
1978–79	34	19	15	.543	2nd, Eastern	Lost in First Round, 0–2 (Angels)
1979–80	35	28	7	.800	1st, Eastern	Won Finals, 3–1 (Cornets)

== Notable players ==
- Lynn Arturi
- Donna Geils
- Althea Gwyn
- Pearl Moore

== Head coaches ==
- Alan Cissorsky (1978–1979)
- Donna Geils (interim, 1979)
- Lavozier Lamar (1979)
- Dean Meminger (1979–1980)
