= Dean Meminger =

American basketball player and coach (1948–2013)

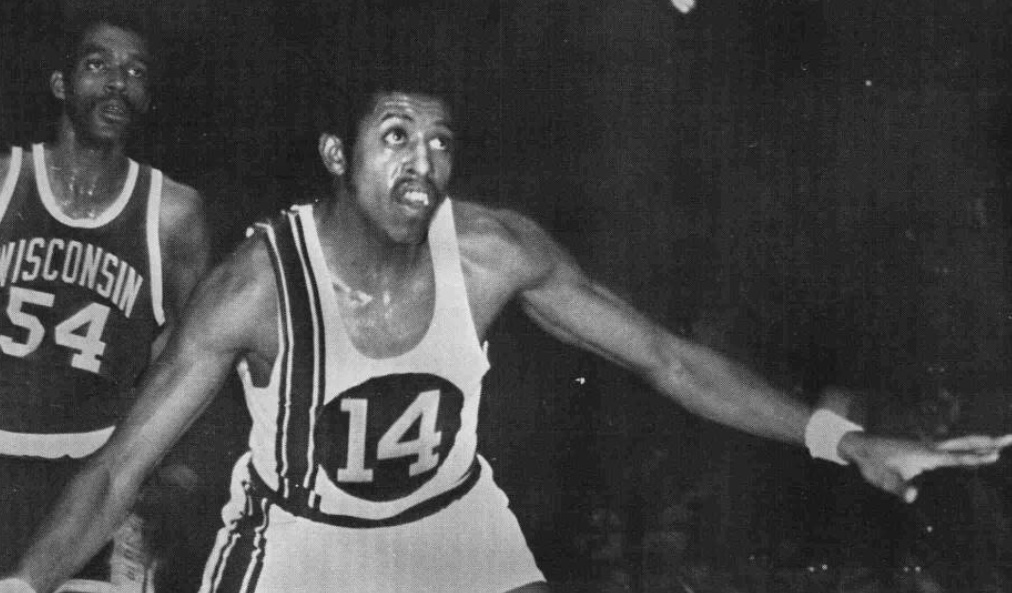
- Meminger at Marquette in 1970

Personal information
- Born: May 13, 1948 Walterboro, South Carolina, U.S.
- Died: August 23, 2013 (aged 65) Bronx, New York, U.S.
- Listed height: 6 ft 1 in (1.85 m)
- Listed weight: 175 lb (79 kg)

Career information
- High school: Rice (New York City, New York)
- College: Marquette (1968–1971)
- NBA draft: 1971: 1st round, 16th overall pick
- Drafted by: New York Knicks
- Playing career: 1971–1977
- Position: Point guard
- Number: 7

Career history

Playing
- 1971–1974: New York Knicks
- 1974–1976: Atlanta Hawks
- 1976–1977: New York Knicks

Coaching
- 1979–1980: New York Stars
- 1980–1981: San Francisco Pioneers
- 1982: Albany Patroons
- 1987: Long Island Knights
- 2003–2004: Manhattanville College

Career highlights
- As player: NBA champion (1973); NIT MVP (1970); Consensus first-team All-American (1971); No. 14 retired by Marquette Golden Eagles; Third-team Parade All-American (1967); As coach: WBL champion (1980); WBL Coach of the Year (1980)

Career statistics
- Points: 2,552 (6.1 ppg)
- Rebounds: 1,086 (2.6 rpg)
- Assists: 1,046 (2.5 apg)
- Stats at NBA.com
- Stats at Basketball Reference

Dean Peter "the Dream" Meminger (May 13, 1948 – August 23, 2013) was an American basketball player and coach. He played college basketball for Marquette where he was the NIT MVP in 1970 and a Consensus first-team All-American in 1971. He later played professionally in the NBA for six seasons, winning the NBA championship with the New York Knicks in 1973. Following his playing career, Meminger went into coaching and in 1980 he led the New York Stars to the WBL championship.

== Early life ==
Meminger was born in Walterboro, South Carolina, and came to Harlem, New York, with his family as a seventh-grader. He starred at Rice High School in New York City as well as making a name for himself on the playgrounds at West 135th Street.

== College career ==
Meminger attended Marquette University, where he played for coach Al McGuire with the then-Warriors. He helped Marquette win the 1970 National Invitational Tournament. Marquette's 1970 team was ranked 8th in the country and was invited to the NCAA tournament. Following a dispute whether to play in the Mid-East or Mid-West Regional, Marquette declined the bid and opted to play in the NIT, where the team outclassed the field. The NCAA was so incensed by Marquette, it instituted a rule that forced an NCAA Division I team to accept an NCAA bid over an NIT bid. A subsequent antitrust case brought by the NIT against the NCAA over this issue was later settled out of court. Meminger was also the MVP of the 1970 National Invitation Tournament, in which Marquette beat Pete Maravich and LSU 101–79 in the semi-finals before defeating St. John's 65–53 in the title game. During his varsity career, he never lost a home game.

== NBA career ==
Meminger was drafted in the first round (16th overall) of the 1971 NBA draft by the New York Knicks, with whom he played from 1971 to 1974 and 1976-1977. As a rookie reserve guard in 1971–72, Meminger averaged 4.6 points in 15 minutes per game, followed by 5.7 points in 18 minutes per game in 1972–73. In that season, Meminger helped the Knicks win their second-ever NBA championship. Playing on a team which featured star guards Walt Frazier, Earl Monroe and Dick Barnett, in Game 7 of the 1973 Eastern Conference finals he replaced Monroe in the second quarter, frustrated the hot-shooting Boston Celtics guard Jo Jo White and scored 13 points. After knocking the Celtics out of the playoffs, the Knicks beat the Los Angeles Lakers for the title. In the postseason, Meminger played in all 17 games for the Knicks, making 31 of 56 field goal attempts for a team-leading .554 percentage.

In Meminger's third season of 1973–74, his playing time increased to 26.7 minutes per game as he averaged 8.3 points and 3.6 rebounds per game (both career highs) and 2.1 assists.

In 1974–75, Meminger played for the Atlanta Hawks, averaging career highs of 27.2 minutes, 5.0 rebounds and 1.5 steals per game in addition to 7.9 points per game. In 1975–76 with the Hawks, his fifth NBA season, in just over 20 minutes per game he averaged 6.0 points and 3.3 assists per game.

The 1976–77 season was his sixth and final NBA season as he returned to the Knicks and averaged 7.9 minutes per game.

== Coaching career ==
Meminger was hired as the head coach of the New York Stars in the Women's Professional Basketball League (WBL) in June 1979. Meminger, with rookie trainer Rick Capistran at his side, guided the Stars to the league championship during the 1979–80 season and was named the league's coach of the year. The team's great success, however, was not enough to save the Stars, which lost so much money the team folded without being able to repeat as champions. Meminger was coaxed to head west, leaving Capistran behind, when he signed up to coach the San Francisco Pioneers in what would be the league's final season.

In 1982, Meminger was hired to coach the Albany Patroons in the Continental Basketball Association. He was dismissed for his combative style with his players and replaced by his former Knicks teammate and friend Phil Jackson. Meminger convinced Jackson to let him try out for the team, but he was unable to resurrect his career on the court.

Meminger next coached the USBL's Long Island Knights in 1987, coaching the likes of Micheal Ray Richardson, Steve Burtt and Geoff Huston, an experience that according to him "almost sent me to the cuckoo's nest".

After spending most of the next 14 years working as a consultant at schools like Hunter College and Hostos Community College, he was hired as the head coach of Manhattanville College in New York in October 2003. He resigned from his post for personal reasons in November 2004 after leading the Valiants to an 18–10 record.

== Personal life ==
Meminger's son goes by the same name and is a news reporter and anchor for NY1 News.

On November 22, 2009, Meminger was rescued from a fire in the Bronx in New York City. Suffering from smoke inhalation, he was admitted to the burn unit of Jacobi Medical Center. Meminger recovered and would remain active in local basketball events. He and trainer Rick Capistran reconnected after 30 years when Capistran tracked his old coach down after reading about Meminger's brush with death in the fire.

Meminger had battled drug addiction for decades and was living in Baltimore, Maryland. He was in Harlem to receive a community award when he was found dead in his room at the Casablanca Hotel in Harlem on August 23, 2013.

== Career statistics ==
Legend
GP	Games played	GS	Games started	MPG	Minutes per game
FG%	Field goal percentage	3P%	3-point field goal percentage	FT%	Free throw percentage
RPG	Rebounds per game	APG	Assists per game	SPG	Steals per game
BPG	Blocks per game	PPG	Points per game	**Bold**	Career high
†	Won an NBA championship	*	Led the league

=== NBA ===
==== Regular season ====
Year	Team	GP	GS	MPG	FG%	FT%	RPG	APG	SPG	BPG	PPG
1971–72	New York	78	3	15.0	.474	.564	2.4	1.3			4.6
1972–73†	New York	**80**	8	18.2	**.515**	.628	2.9	1.7			5.7
1973–74	New York	78	**50**	26.7	.508	.644	**3.6**	2.1	.8	**.1**	**8.3**
1974–75	Atlanta	**80**		**27.2**	.466	.639	2.7	**5.0**	**1.5**	**.1**	7.9
1975–76	Atlanta	68		20.9	.409	**.658**	2.2	3.3	.8	**.1**	6.0
1976–77	New York	32	0	7.9	.417	.565	.8	.9	.3	.0	1.3
Career		416	61	20.6	.475	.627	2.6	2.5	.9	.1	6.1

==== Playoffs ====
Year	Team	GP	MPG	FG%	FT%	RPG	APG	SPG	BPG	PPG
1972	New York	16*	17.3	.421	**.630**	**2.7**	1.3			4.1
1973†	New York	**17***	**19.0**	**.554**	.559	2.2	**2.2**			**4.8**
1974	New York	12	14.9	.344	.200	2.0	2.1	.3	.0	1.9
Career		45	17.3	.455	.561	2.3	1.8	.3	.0	3.8
