= JW Marriott Essex House =

Hotel in Manhattan, New York

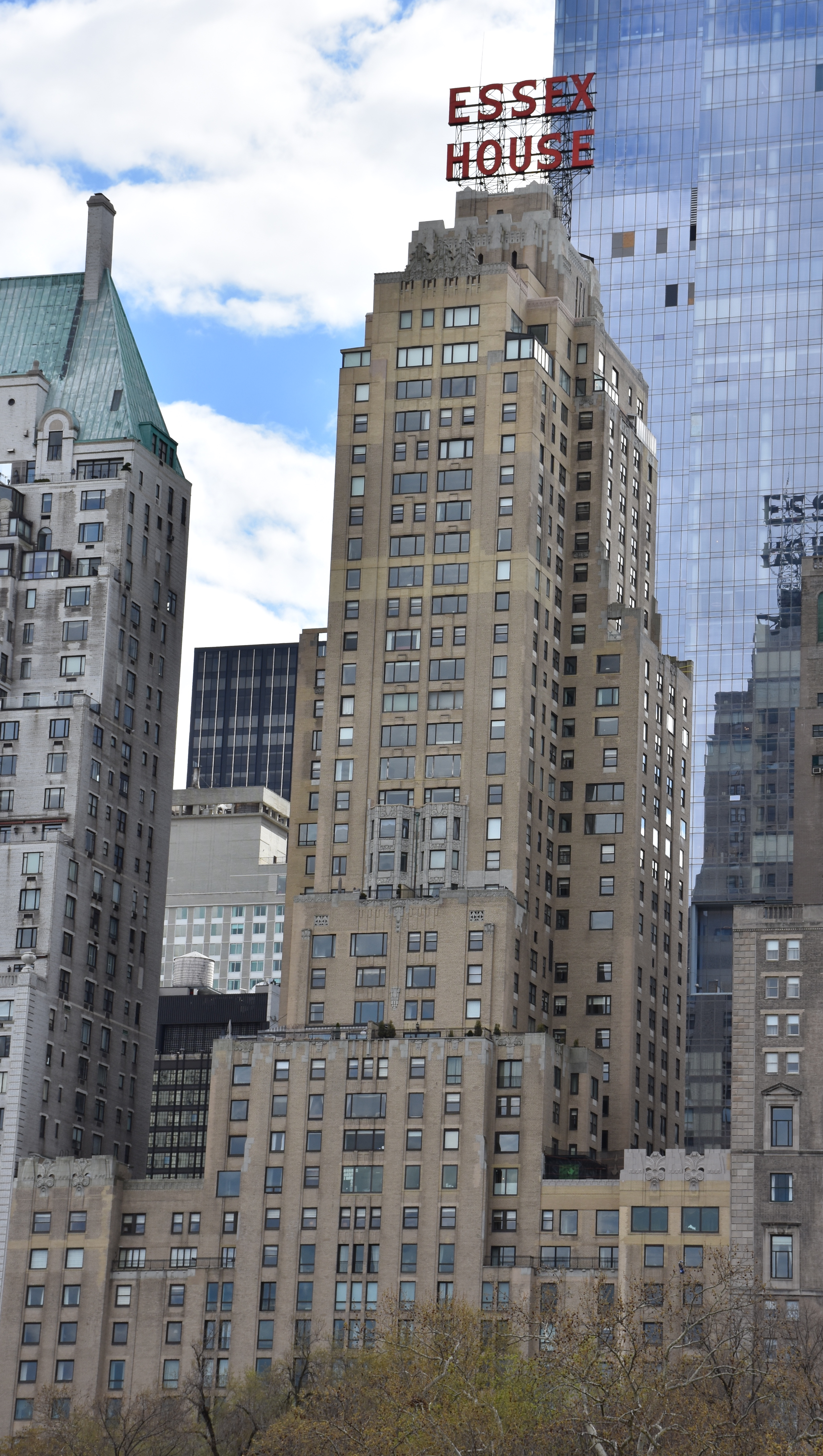
- JW Marriott Essex House in April 2015

General information
- Location: 160 Central Park South; New York, New York
- Coordinates: 40.766252°N 73.978512°W
- Opening: October 1, 1931
- Owner: Anbang Insurance Group
- Operator: JW Marriott Hotels

Height
- Height: 461.0 ft (140.51 m)

Technical details
- Floor count: 43

Design and construction
- Architects: Frank Grad & Sons

Other information
- Number of rooms: 426
- Number of suites: 101
- Number of restaurants: 2

Website
- JW Marriott Essex House New York

The JW Marriott Essex House (commonly known as the Essex House) is a luxury hotel at 160 Central Park South in Midtown Manhattan, New York City, at the southern border of Central Park. Opened in 1931, the hotel is 44 stories tall and contains 426 Art Deco–style rooms and 101 suites, as well as 147 condominium residences. It features a distinctive red neon rooftop sign.

JW Marriott Essex House New York is a member of Historic Hotels of America, the official program of the National Trust for Historic Preservation.

== History ==
JW Marriott Essex House is on part of the site of an eight-building housing cooperative complex called Navarro Flats, developed by José Francisco de Navarro from 1882 to 1884. At the time, Central Park South contained a multitude of high-class apartment buildings. However, Navarro Flats was not successful, and it closed by the 1920s. Construction began on October 30, 1929, one day after the Wall Street Crash of 1929. The hotel was first intended to be named the Park Tower and then the Sevilla Tower. However the Great Depression slowed construction and the hotel did not open until October 1, 1931, as the Essex House.

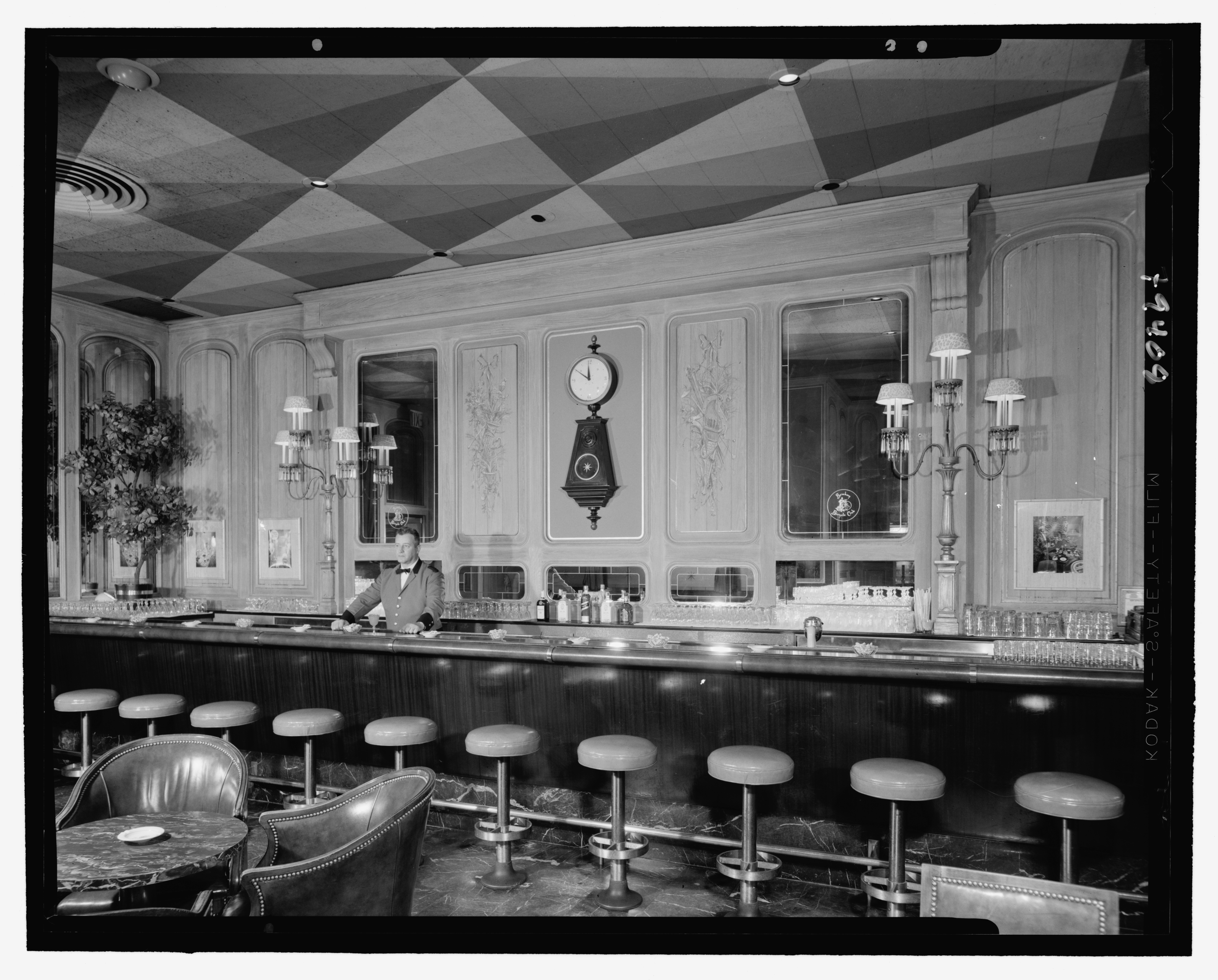
Interior of the bar in 1963

=== Marriott Essex House ===
In 1932, the hotel was taken from its bankrupt owner, Abraham E. Lefcourt, by the U.S. government's Reconstruction Finance Corporation. That same year, the hotel erected its iconic six-story sign on the roof. In 1946, the RFC sold the hotel to the Sterling National Bank & Trust Co. who sold it to Marriott Hotels in 1969, who operated it as Marriott's Essex House.

=== Nikko Essex House ===
In October 1984, Marriott sold the hotel to Japan Air Lines. J. Willard Marriott stated that JAL had "offered a good price, and it'll be easier to market our new hotel," referring to the nearly-completed New York Marriott Marquis nearby. JAL operated the hotel through its Nikko Hotels division as Essex House.

The hotel was renovated from 1990 to 1991, at a cost of over $75 million. The renovation work was complicated by the fact that Marriott had sold approximately 100 units in the hotel as condominiums. Their owners had to be paid to leave during renovations and the new guest rooms had to be constructed around the residential units, which were located randomly throughout the building. The renovations decreased the room count from 690 to 591 and added central air-conditioning, replacing the hotel's unsightly window units. The restored hotel reopened on September 24, 1991, as Essex House Hotel Nikko New York. Japan Air Lines sold the hotel to Strategic Hotels & Resorts in 1999, who engaged Starwood Hotels to manage it as part of the Westin Hotels division as Essex House – A Westin Hotel.

=== Jumeirah Essex House ===
The Dubai Investment Group acquired the hotel from Strategic in 2006 for $424 million. The group put the property under the management of its Jumeirah Hotels & Resorts chain as Jumeirah Essex House and undertook a $90 million renovation, overseen by Hirsch Bedner Associates, an Atlanta-based design firm.

=== JW Marriott Essex House ===
In 2012, Strategic Hotels & Resorts re-acquired the hotel from the Dubai Investment Group for $325 million—$50 million less than Dubai Investment paid for the property six years earlier. The hotel was renamed JW Marriott Essex House New York on September 8, 2012, after the sale closed.

In March 2016, Anbang Insurance Group, a Beijing-based insurance company, purchased Strategic Hotels & Resorts. The deal included the Essex House and 15 other luxury hotels and resorts. The deal was announced at $6.5 billion, but was reduced to $5.5 billion after the U.S. prohibited the sale of the Hotel del Coronado to overseas buyers, due to its location adjacent to Naval Base Coronado.

In November 2018 it was reported that, under pressure from the Chinese government to offload overseas assets, Anbang had hired Bank of America to solicit buyers for Strategic Hotels & Resorts.

The hotel was formerly the home of a 3 Michelin-starred restaurant, Alain Ducasse at Essex House. However, Ducasse closed the restaurant at Essex House in January 2007. In early 2008, South Gate Restaurant and Bar opened in the hotel.

== Notable people ==
The hotel was one of the final residences of musician David Bowie and Russian-born composer Igor Stravinsky, and the place of death of the musician Donny Hathaway. On January 13, 1979, Hathaway began a recording session with producers/musicians Eric Mercury and James Mtume. Each reported that Hathaway began behaving irrationally, seeming to be paranoid and delusional. According to Mtume, Hathaway said that white people were trying to kill him and had connected his brain to a machine for the purpose of stealing his music and his voice. Given Hathaway's behavior, Mercury said that he decided the recording session could not continue, so he aborted it and all of the musicians went home. Hours later, Hathaway was found dead on the pavement below the window of his 15th-floor room in the Essex House. His hotel room door was locked from the inside and the window glass had been carefully removed. There were no signs of a struggle, leading investigators to rule that Hathaway's death was a suicide. Frequent collaborator Roberta Flack was devastated and, spurred by his death, included the few duets they had finished on her next album, Roberta Flack Featuring Donny Hathaway (1980). According to Mercury, Hathaway's final recording was "You Are My Heaven", a song Mercury co-wrote with Stevie Wonder.

Casey Stengel frequented the Essex House during his New York Yankees and New York Mets managing careers. Many visiting Major League Baseball teams have lodged at the Essex House when playing the Mets and Yankees.
