= Minnesota Fillies =

- Division: Eastern (1978–1979); Midwest (1979–1980); Central (1980–1981)
- League: Women's Professional Basketball League
- Founded: 1978
- Folded: 1981
- History: Minnesota Fillies; 1978–1981
- Arena: Met Center (1978–1980); Williams Arena (1980); Minneapolis Auditorium (1980-1981)
- Location: Minneapolis, MN
- Team colors: Royal blue, golden yellow, white
- Team manager: J. Gordon Nevers
- Head coach: Julia Yeater (1978–1979); Terry Kunze (1979–1981); Lynnette Sjoquist (1981)
- Ownership: J. Gordon Nevers
- Championships: 0
- Conference titles: 0
- Division titles: 0

The Minnesota Fillies were an American women's professional basketball team based in Minnesota that competed in the Women's Professional Basketball League from 1978 to 1981. The Fillies were one of three teams to play in all three of the league's seasons. The Met Center served as the team's home court during their first two seasons. In the team's last season, they played home games at the Minneapolis Auditorium.

The Women's Professional Basketball League disbanded in 1981 due to financial problems. Most of these problems were attributed to owners defaulting on creditors and outstanding payroll entitlements to players and other employees. In 1981, Commissioner Sherwin Fischer promised that the Minnesota Fillies players would receive their entitlements. When the Commissioner failed to deliver on this promise, the Fillies walked off the court in Chicago ten minutes before a scheduled game against the Chicago Hustle. Despite a full house at De Paul Alumni Hall, the game was forfeited. The Fillies finished out the final games of the 1980–1981 season with replacement players.

== Season-by-season records ==
Note: W = wins, L = losses, % = win–loss %

Season	W	L	%	Playoffs	Results
Minnesota Fillies
1978-79	17	17	.500		
1979-80	22	12	.647	Won quarterfinals Lost semi-finals	2–1 New Orleans; 1–2 Iowa
1980-81	7	28	.200		
Totals	46	57	.447		
Playoffs	3	3	.500		

== Personnel ==
Julia Yeater was hired to coach the Fillies in 1978. She had been the head coach of the women's basketball team at Western Kentucky University for two seasons, with a record of 45 wins and 17 losses. Yeater reflected that she joined the team because she wanted to see more female head coaches in the newly established WBL. Yeater received her master's degree from University of Kansas.

Women also played in the Semi Pro League sponsored by Steve and Dave Winfield, professional baseball players. These women included Janelle D. Gibson, who was studying at Minneapolis Community College at the time, and Kathy Burks, a 19-year-old attending the University of Minnesota.

The president and general manager of the team was J. Gordon Nevers.
