= Women's Professional Basketball League =

American sports league (1978–1981)

- Sport: Basketball
- Founded: 1978
- Folded: 1981
- No. of teams: 17 throughout league history
- Country: United States
- Last champion: Nebraska Wranglers (1st)
- Most titles: Houston Angels; New York Stars; Nebraska Wranglers (1 each)

The Women's Professional Basketball League (abbreviated WBL) was a professional women's basketball league in the United States. The league played three seasons from the fall of 1978 to the spring of 1981. The league was the first professional women's basketball league in the United States.

== Formation and 1978–79 season ==
The WPBL was founded by sports entrepreneur Bill Byrne. The league began with a player draft held in Manhattan's Essex House in July 1978, with eight teams participating. While few of the teams had firm commitments on playing locations (or team names, for that matter), the league planned to play a 34-game season with teams in Chicago, Houston, Iowa, Milwaukee, Minneapolis, New Jersey, New York City and Washington, D.C. Houston drafted Ann Meyers from UCLA, while Lusia Harris, a collegiate star at Delta State University, was selected by the Houston team, but was reluctant to commit to playing after hearing the $3,000 to $5,000 salaries estimated by the Minnesota franchise. With its last pick in the draft, the Cornets selected Uljana Semjonova, a 6-foot-11-inch player for the Soviet Union women's national basketball team who would be inducted as an inaugural member of the Women's Basketball Hall of Fame in the class of 1999, but would never play a game in the WBL. The New Jersey Gems selected Carol Blazejowski from Montclair State College, but she announced while on tour in Bulgaria with the U.S. national women's team through her coach Maureen Wendelken that she had no intention of playing professionally and that her goal was to retain her amateur standing to be able to play for the U.S. at the 1980 Summer Olympics. Molly Bolin, who grew up in Moravia, Iowa, became the first player signed by any team in the WBL when she was signed by the Iowa Cornets.

The league played its first game on December 9, 1978, between the Chicago Hustle and the Milwaukee Does at the Milwaukee Arena, with the league's inaugural game attracting four minutes of coverage in the previous night's CBS Evening News with Walter Cronkite. Milwaukee mayor Henry Maier issued a proclamation likening this first game to the first professional football game, played in Latrobe, Pennsylvania, and the first pro baseball game, played in Cincinnati. The Does had a crowd of 7,824 at the game, which saw the hometown team lose to Chicago 92–87, with Debra Waddy Rossow scoring 30 points to lead the Hustle.

The league was divided into two divisions, with Chicago, Iowa, Milwaukee, and Minnesota Fillies playing in the Western Division, while the Dayton Rockettes, Houston Angels, New Jersey, and New York Stars were in the East. The eight initial teams paid $50,000 for their franchise, while the four teams to be added for the 1979–80 season were expected to pay $100,000, and $250,000 per team for each of four more teams in the following season.

The league was able to arrange an All-Star game in 1979, which was played at the Felt Forum in New York City's Madison Square Garden in front of 2,731 fans. The game was hastily arranged and inserted into the league's schedule, using a court borrowed from the United States Military Academy at West Point, and forcing some players to have to make hectic travel arrangements to get to their next regular season game. The East beat the Midwest by a score of 112–99. Althea Gwyn of the New York Stars led the East with 19 points and 16 rebounds, while Chicago Hustle players Debra Waddy Rossow with 26 points and Rita Easterling with 19 points led the Midwest. Easterling, who also had 18 assists, was named the game's most valuable player.

Behind 36 points by Paula Mayo, the Houston Angels defeated the Iowa Cornets on May 2, 1979, to take the league's first championship, 111–104 in the final game of a best three-out-of-five competition.

== 1979–80 season ==
The league made it through its first season with all eight teams in operation, though the Dayton Rockettes had been taken over by the league in February 1979 and was to be relocated to either Indianapolis or Los Angeles. New franchises had been awarded to Dallas, New Orleans, San Francisco and St. Louis, while applications were received for potential franchises from Baltimore, Boston, Los Angeles, Philadelphia and Washington, D.C.

The Eastern Division included the New Jersey Gems, New Orleans Pride, New York Stars, Philadelphia Fox, St. Louis Streak and Washington Metros. The Midwest Division included the Chicago Hustle, Iowa Cornets, Milwaukee Does and Minnesota Fillies. The Western Division included the California Dreams, Dallas Diamonds, Houston Angels and San Francisco Pioneers.

On January 30, 1980, the West defeated the East, 115–112, in the 1980 WBL All-Star Game.

On April 9, 1980, despite Iowa's league-leading scorer Molly Bolin's 36 points, the New York Stars held on to win game four of the finals 125–114, behind 27 points by Pearl Moore and 22 by Janice Thomas. Stars coach Dean Meminger called the game the "culmination of a year of hard work". In what proved to be a harbinger of things to come, however, the Stars asked to go on a two-year hiatus not long after winning the title.

== 1980–81 season and demise ==
In a game scheduled in Chicago on March 21, 1981, players of the Minnesota Fillies, one of only three teams to play in all three seasons that the league was in existence, walked off the court before the starting lineups were announced in a game against the Chicago Hustle in a protest over unpaid salaries. Referees and team coach Terry Kunze tried to cajole the players back onto the court to play their game, but were unsuccessful. The team, which had been averaging 1,000 to 1,500 in attendance per game, were suspended from the WPBL by commissioner Sherwin Fischer, who called the walkout as "very detrimental to the league".

On February 7, 1981, Nebraska Wranglers player Connie Kunzmann was reported missing and was later pronounced dead. Police arrested Lance Tibke, who later pleaded guilty to her second degree murder.

The Nebraska Wranglers won the league's 1980–81 title, defeating the Dallas Diamonds three games to two. In the fifth and final game, Rosie Walker led the victors with 39 points, while the Wranglers' defense held Nancy Lieberman of Dallas to 12 points, less than half of her season average.

Bill Byrne had founded the league hoping that the 1980 Summer Olympics would showcase the game's stars and bring media and public attention to women's basketball, but the United States-led boycott of the Moscow games only added to the league's misfortunes.

By the fall of 1981, the league was showing what The New York Times described as "feeble flickers of life." That November, commissioner Dave Almstead announced the league had disbanded, having generated $14 million in losses in its three years on the court. Almstead, who had succeeded Fischer as league commissioner in May 1981, announced the league's shutdown after trying unsuccessfully to contact the surviving eight teams' investors and team owners. Fischer, owner of the Chicago Hustle, insisted that he would field a team that would go barnstorming if the league went out of existence, and thought that teams would be fielded for a fourth season by Chicago, Nebraska and New Orleans. Some of the players were able to play professionally again in the 1984 Women's American Basketball Association.

== Teams ==
- California Dreams (1979–80)
- Chicago Hustle (1978–81)
- Dallas Diamonds (1979–81)
- Dayton Rockettes (1978–79)
- Houston Angels (1978–80)
- Iowa Cornets (1978–80)
- Milwaukee Does (1978–80)
- Minnesota Fillies (1978–81)
- Nebraska Wranglers (1980–81)
- New England Gulls (1980–81)
- New Jersey Gems (1978–81)
- New Orleans Pride (1979–81)
- New York Stars (1978–80)
- Philadelphia Fox (1979–80)
- St. Louis Streak (1979–81)
- San Francisco Pioneers (1979–81)
- Tampa Bay Sun (planned expansion team in 1980, sold before the start of the season and became the New England Gulls)
- Washington Metros (1979–80)

== League champions ==
- (1978–79) Houston Angels
- (1979–80) New York Stars
- (1980–81) Nebraska Wranglers

== Selected notable players ==
- Carol Blazejowski, former general manager for the New York Liberty
- "Machine Gun" Molly Bolin, co-MVP for the 1979–80 season
- Brenda Chapman, the WBL scoring leader in the 1978–79 season
- Denise "Neicy" Craig, former Dayton Rockettes player, Hall of Fame inductee of Shaw University, Hall of Fame inductee of CIAA, Hall of Fame inductee of Princeton High School Athletics, Princeton, New Jersey
- Rita Easterling, MVP for the 1978–79 season
- Donna Geils, now Donna Orender, former president of the WNBA
- Althea Gwyn
- Cardie Hicks, one of the first women known to have dunked in a professional game, doing so while playing professionally in the Netherlands in 1978.
- Marie Kocurek
- Nancy Lieberman, former Phoenix Mercury player, first-ever coach of the Detroit Shock, now a basketball analyst on ESPN
- Muffet McGraw, former head coach at University of Notre Dame
- Ann Meyers, top pick in the WBL draft in 1978 for the Houston Angels, WBL Co-MVP for the 1979–1980 season playing for the New Jersey Gems, now the general manager for the Phoenix Mercury
- Anita Ortega, played with the San Francisco Pioneers and a brief stint with the Minnesota Fillies. She was one of the women that decided not to play in a Fillies game due to contractual violations by the owners. She was a 1980 WBL All-Star and described as the "Dr.J" of her time because of her crafty athletic moves. She later became the highest ranking Afro-Puerto Rican in the Los Angeles Police Department.
- Mary Jo Peppler, renowned volleyball player and coach and ABC Superstars champion who played for the New Jersey Gems in 1978-79
- Rhonda Rompola, head coach at Southern Methodist University from 1991 to 2016
- Susan Summons, 3rd round draft pick by the New Jersey Gems and later traded to the New England Gulls, now head coach at Miami Dade College
- Rosie Walker, MVP for the 1980–81 season
- Kaye Young, later known as Kaye Young Cowher, the late wife of American football coach Bill Cowher

== See also ==
- American Basketball League
- National Women's Basketball League
- Women's American Basketball Association
- Women's National Basketball Association
- Timeline of women's basketball history
