= Bethany (given name) =

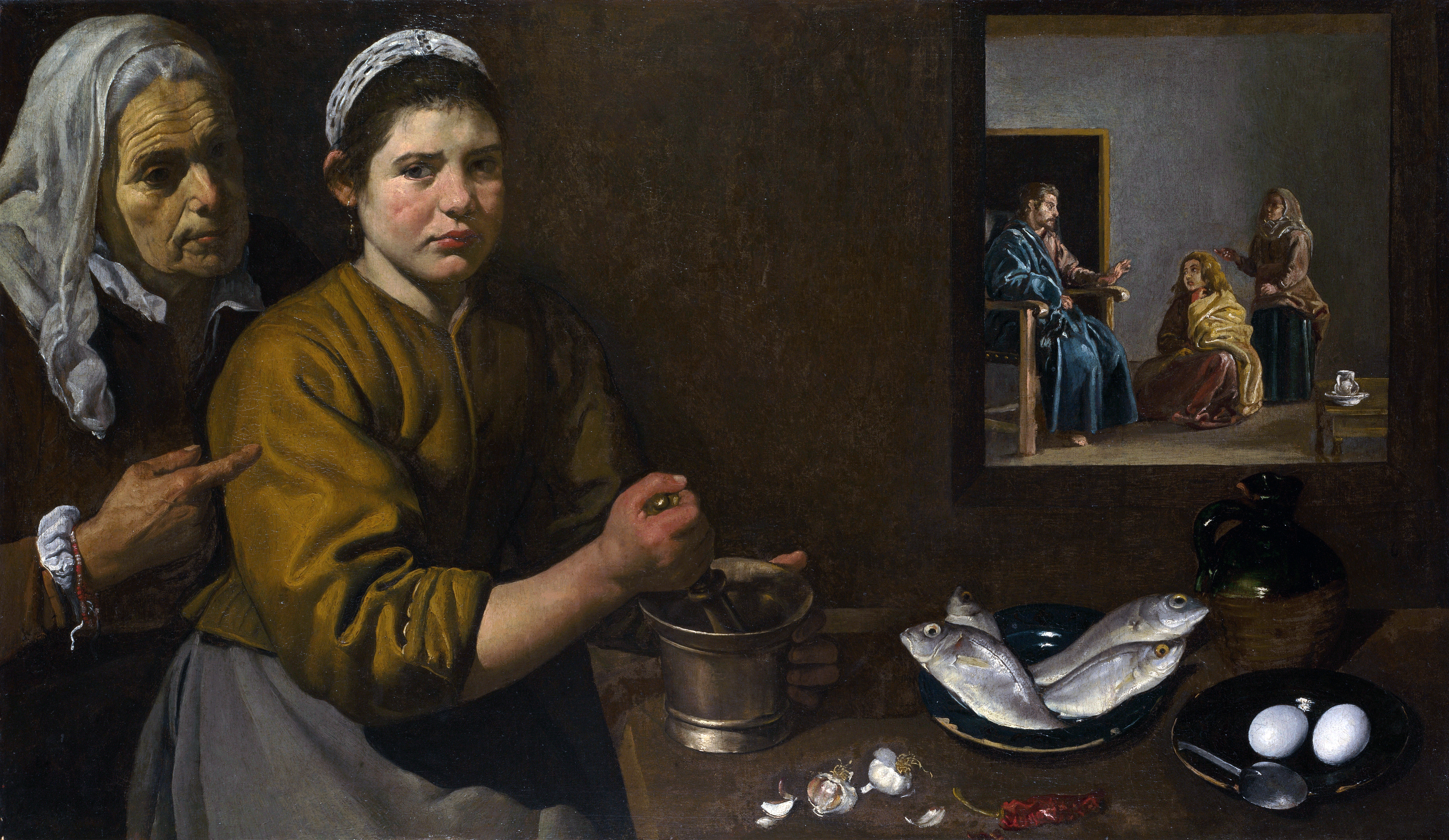
- Christ in the House of Martha and Mary (being Mary of Bethany; c. 1618) by Velázquez
- Pronunciation: /ˈbɛθəni/ BETH-ən-ee
- Gender: Female

Origin
- Meaning: lit. "House of figs” - name of a Biblical village)
- Region of origin: Land of Israel

Other names
- Nicknames: Beth, Effie, Bea, Bethel, Betty, Thany
- Related names: Annie, Beth, Effie, Betty, Beatrix, Beatrice

Bethany (Greek: Βηθανία (Bethania), which is probably of Aramaic or Hebrew origin, meaning “House of figs" is a feminine given name derived from the Biblical place name, Bethany, a town near Jerusalem, at the foot of the Mount of Olives, where Lazarus lived in the New Testament, along with his sisters, Mary and Martha, and where Jesus stayed during Holy Week before his crucifixion.

The name has been well-used in English-speaking countries. It was the 59th most popular name for girls in England and Wales in 2010, having ranked as high as 11th most popular name in those countries in 1999. It was the 79th most popular name for girls in Scotland in 2010. It ranked in the 100 most popular names for girls in the United States during the 1980s, reaching its pinnacle of popularity in 1987, when it was the 87th most popular name for girls, but its use has declined, falling to 369th most popular name there in 2010. The name Bethany is the English transliteration of the Greek name Bethania. It has been in use as a rare given name in the English-speaking world since the 19th century, used primarily by Catholics in honour of Mary of Bethany.

== List ==
Notable people with the name include:

- Bethany Albertson, American political psychologist
- Bethany Alvord (born 1957), American judge
- Bethany Antonia (born 1997), English actress
- Bethany Ashton Wolf, American film director and screenwriter
- Bethany Balcer (born 1997), American soccer player
- Bethany Ball, American fiction writer
- Bethany Ballard, American politician
- Bethany Barratt (born 1972), American political scientist and author
- Bethany Barton, American author and illustrator
- Bethany Beardslee (born 1925), American soprano
- Bethany Black (born 1978), English stand-up comedian
- Bethany Brookshire, American science journalist
- Bethany Bryan (born 1993), British rower
- Bethany Calcaterra-McMahon (born 1974), American luger
- Bethany Campbell (1941–2022), American writer of romance novels
- Bethany Collins, American artist
- Bethany Cosentino (born 1986), American singer
- Bethany Dillon (born 1988), Christian soft rock artist
- Bethany Donaphin (born 1980), American basketball player
- Bethany Edmunds, New Zealand artist, curator and weaver
- Bethany Ehlmann, American planetary scientist
- Bethany England (born 1994), English professional footballer
- Bethany Firth (born 1996), Northern Irish swimmer
- Bethenny Frankel (born 1970), American entrepreneur and Tv personality
- Bethany Galat (born 1995), American swimmer
- Bethany Goldsmith (1927–2004), American baseball pitcher
- Bethany Hall-Long (born 1963), American politician from Delaware
- Bethany Hallam (born 1989), American politician
- Bethany Hamilton (born 1990), American surfer and shark attack victim
- Bethany Harmer (born 2000), English cricketer
- Bethany Hart (born 1977), American hammer thrower
- Bethany Hayward (born 1996), British cyclist
- Bethany-May Howard (born 1995), English footballer
- Bethany Hughes (1985–2002), Canadian cancer patient
- Bethany Johnson (born 2001), Canadian wheelchair basketball player
- Bethany Kehdy (born 1981), Lebanese-American culinary expert and cookbook author
- Bethany Koby, American designer and inventor
- Bethany Lee (1952–2003), Australian film and television actress
- Bethany Joy Lenz (born 1981), American singer and actress
- Bethany LeSueur (born 1983), American basketball player
- Bethany Anne Lind, American stage and screen actor
- Bethany Mandel, American conservative commentator
- Bethany Rose Marsh, British mathematician
- Bethanie Mattek-Sands (born 1985), American tennis player
- Bethany McLean (born 1970), American editor, business writer, and author
- Bethany C. Meyers, American fitness entrepreneur
- Bethany Mooradian (born 1975), American author, lecturer and internet personality
- Bethany Mota (born 1995), American video blogger
- Bethany Roberts (born 1949), American children’s author
- Bethany Rooney, American television director and producer
- Bethany Sachtleben (born 1992), American long-distance runner
- Bethany Shriever (born 1999) is a British BMX racer
- Bethany Soye, American politician
- Bethany Stahl, American author and illustrator
- Bethany Teachman, clinical psychologist
- Bethany Veney (c. 1813 – 1916), American slave and autobiographer
- Bethany Walsh (born 1985), Australian synchronized swimmer
- Bethany Whitmore (born 1999), Australian actress
- Bethany Williamson (born 1999), British trampoline gymnast
- Bethany Yellowtail, Native American fashion designer
- Bethany Zummo (born 1993), American sitting volleyball player

=== Fictional characters ===
- Bethany Cabe, fictional character in the Marvel Comics universe
- Bethany Dutton, a fictional character in Yellowstone.
- Bethany Owens, a Season 4 contestant in Fetch! with Ruff Ruffman
- Bethany Platt, fictional character on Coronation Street
- Bethany Sloane, fictional lead character in the Kevin Smith film Dogma
