= 1977–78 AIAW Division I women's basketball rankings =

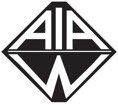
- Season: 1977–78
- AIAW Tournament: 1978
- Preseason No. 1: Tennessee
- AIAW Tournament Champions: UCLA
AIAW Division I women's basketball rankings


A single human poll represents the 1977–78 AIAW Division I women's basketball rankings, the AP Poll, in addition to various publications' preseason polls. The AP poll was initially a poll of coaches conducted via telephone, where coaches identified top teams and a list of the Top 20 teams was produced. The contributors continued to be coaches until 1994, when the AP took over administration of the poll from Mel Greenberg, and switched to a panel of writers.

The AP poll is currently a poll of sportswriters. The AP conducts polls weekly through the end of the regular season and conference play.

== Legend ==
–	Not ranked
(#)	Ranking

== AP Poll ==
Team	25-Nov	7-Dec	14-Dec	21-Dec	11-Jan	18-Jan	25-Jan	1-Feb	8-Feb	15-Feb	22-Feb	1-Mar	5-Mar	15-Mar
Tennessee	1	5	5	3	2	3	3	3	3	1	1	1	1	1
Wayland Baptist	3	1	1	1	1	4	4	4	4	6	4	4	3	2
North Carolina St.	6	6	4	5	4	2	2	2	2	5	3	3	5	3
Montclair St.	7	4	6	11	14	10	10	10	T10	10	10	10	10	4
UCLA	5	7	8	7	10	11	9	9	9	9	8	8	7	5
Maryland	12	11	10	10	7	8	8	8	7	4	6	6	4	6
Queens (NY)	17	15	12	9	6	6	6	6	8	8	7	7	11	7
Valdosta St.	–	–	–	–	–	–	17	17	15	16	15	15	13	8
Delta St.	4	3	3	2	5	5	5	5	5	3	5	5	6	9
LSU	2	2	2	4	3	1	1	1	1	2	2	2	2	10
Saint Joseph’s	8	8	9	8	12	12	11	11	T10	11	9	9	8	11
Old Dominion	9	9	7	6	8	7	7	7	6	7	11	11	9	12
Missouri	–	14	–	–	18	16	16	15	19	19	18	18	15	13
Stephen F. Austin	14	13	13	14	13	15	15	16	17	–	–	–	–	14
Texas	T20	20	19	16	9	13	12	12	12	14	14	14	12	15
Ohio St.	–	18	17	–	–	–	–	–	–	T20	–	–	–	16
Penn St.	–	–	15	13	15	14	14	14	14	13	12	12	16	17
Southern Conn. St.	13	12	11	12	11	9	13	13	13	12	16	16	–	18
Memphis	–	–	–	19	19	19	19	18	16	15	13	13	14	19
Baylor	15	T16	20	20	20	18	18	–	–	–	–	–	–	–
Cal Poly Pomona	–	–	–	–	–	–	–	–	20	18	19	19	T18	–
Immaculata	10	10	16	17	17	17	20	20	–	–	–	–	–	–
Kansas	–	–	18	15	16	T20	–	19	18	17	17	17	T18	–
Kansas St.	16	–	–	–	–	–	–	–	–	–	–	–	–	–
Kentucky	19	19	–	–	–	T20	–	–	–	–	–	–	–	–
Louisiana Tech	–	–	–	–	–	–	–	–	–	T20	T20	20	20	–
Rutgers	18	T16	14	18	–	–	–	–	–	–	–	–	–	–
St. John’s (NY)	–	–	–	–	–	–	–	–	–	–	T20	–	–	–
Tennessee Tech	11	–	–	–	–	–	–	–	–	–	–	–	–	–
UNLV	–	–	–	–	–	–	–	–	–	–	–	–	17	–
Long Beach St.	T20	–	–	–	–	–	–	–	–	–	–	–	–	T20
Ole Miss	–	–	–	–	–	–	–	–	–	–	–	–	–	T20
