= UCLA Bruins women's basketball =

College women's basketball team

2026–27 UCLA Bruins women's basketball team
- University: University of California, Los Angeles
- Head coach: Cori Close (16th season)
- Location: Los Angeles, California
- Arena: Pauley Pavilion (capacity: 12,829)
- Conference: Big Ten
- Nickname: Bruins
- Colors: Blue and gold
- Student section: The Den
- All-time record: 890–549 (.618)

NCAA Division I tournament champions
- 2026
Other NCAA Division I tournament results
Final Four	2025, 2026
Elite Eight	1999, 2018, 2025, 2026
Sweet Sixteen	1985, 1992, 1999, 2016, 2017, 2018, 2019, 2023, 2024, 2025, 2026
Appearances	1983, 1985, 1990, 1992, 1998, 1999, 2000, 2004, 2006, 2010, 2011, 2013, 2016, 2017, 2018, 2019, 2021, 2023, 2024, 2025, 2026

AIAW tournament champions
- 1978
Other AIAW tournament results
Final Four	1978, 1979
Quarterfinals	1978, 1979
Second round	1978, 1979
Appearances	1978, 1979, 1981

Conference tournament champions
- Pac-12: 2006; Big Ten: 2025, 2026

Conference regular-season champions
- Pac-12: 1975, 1976, 1977, 1978, 1979, 1999; Big Ten: 2026

Uniforms
Home	Away

The UCLA Bruins women's basketball team, established in 1974, represents the University of California, Los Angeles (UCLA) in the Big Ten Conference. The team competes in women's college basketball against teams from the Division I level of the National Collegiate Athletic Association (NCAA). The current coach is Cori Close. Home games are played in Pauley Pavilion in Los Angeles.

The team was a member of the Association for Intercollegiate Athletics for Women (AIAW) until joining the NCAA in 1981–82 season. The team was a member of the Western Collegiate Athletic Association conference until women's basketball was organized in the Pac-10 conference for the 1986–87 season. The 1977-78 UCLA Bruins women's basketball team won the 1978 AIAW National Large College Basketball Championship, and a banner commemorating the championship hangs in Pauley Pavilion. The 2014–15 UCLA Bruins women's basketball team won the 2015 WNIT championship. In the 2024–25 Bruins' season, the Bruins made their first Final Four appearance in the modern era of the NCAA championship., The 2025–26 Bruins went 37–1 and won the program's second women's basketball national championship, and the first basketball championship in the NCAA era.

== History ==
Women's sports programs at UCLA were established as a response to Title IX. Dr. Judith Holland was named the athletic director for women's sports. In 1974, UCLA was a well established men's basketball powerhouse, having won 9 of their 10 championships under Coach John Wooden. The first UCLA Women's basketball team was established for the 1974-75 season. Ann Meyers was the first woman recruited to play in college basketball at any university with a four-year scholarship. This is regarded as one of the defining moments in the history of women's sports.

=== Coach Kenny Washington (1974-75) ===
Kenny Washington, a basketball star on UCLA men's championship teams, became the first coach of the UCLA women's basketball program. He coached one season, leading the Bruins to an 18–4 record behind star Ann Meyers. He was the first African-American head coach at UCLA in any sport.

=== Coach Ellen Mosher (1975-77) ===
In the 1976-77 season Coach Ellen Mosher and the Bruins won the WCAA with a 7–1 record. The largest win of the season was over number 5 ranked Cal State Fullerton coached by Billie Moore, which was the first Bruin win over a top ten ranked team. Moore's Fullerton teams had won the WCAA conference each of the previous 7 seasons. Overall the Bruins finished with a 16–1 regular season record and an invitation to the 1977 AIAW National Large College Basketball Championship. They lost in the regionals to the same Cal State Fullerton team with whom they had split the regular season conference games. Subsequently, the Bruins were invited to the 1978 National Women's Invitational Tournament (NWIT). Advancing to the finals of the NWIT, they lost to Number 7 ranked Wayland Baptist in the championship game. Their win loss record was 20–3. In April, Mosher resigned and Moore was hired as the new head coach. Mosher took a job as the coach of the Minnesota Golden Gophers women's basketball team.

=== Coach Billie Moore (1977-93) ===
Billie Moore was hired from Cal State Fullerton for the 1977 season. Moore had been the first women's basketball coach to lead Team USA in the inaugural women's basketball competition at the 1976 Summer Olympic games.

In her first two seasons, Moore led the Bruins to high national rankings and conference championships. The Bruins won their first national championship in the AIAW in the 1977-78 season, and then achieved an AIAW third place finish in the 1978-79 season. Two more conference second place finishes followed, with appearances in the AIAW tournament. The Bruins would compete in the NCAA tournament for the first time in the 1982-83 season. The 1984-85 team advanced to the NCAA sweet sixteen for the first time. The Pac-10 conference women's basketball competition began in the 1986-87 season.

The Bruins were 127–102 in Moore's last eight seasons, and never finished higher than third place in the Pacific-10 Conference during that span. She resigned after a 13–14 finish in the 1992–93 season, amid criticism in recent years of her coaching methods, as well as an ongoing review of her program after a player alleged mental and verbal abuse by Moore. She coached at UCLA for 16 seasons, compiling a 296–181 record.

==== 1977-78 Season: AIAW National Championship ====
The 1978 team, led by Ann Meyers, Denise Curry and Anita Ortega, won the 1978 AIAW tournament under head coach Billie Moore. The Bruins defeated Maryland 90–74 on March 25, 1978 in front of a record crowd of 9,351 at Pauley Pavilion for the championship. Meyers had 20 points, 10 rebounds, nine assists and eight steals. Ortega recorded a team high 23 points. This team finished the season with a 27–3 record, including a then WCAA conference title.

=== Coach Kathy Olivier (1994-2008) ===
Kathy Olivier moved from rival USC under Linda Sharp as an assistant coach under Billie Moore in 1986. Following Moore's resignation, UCLA promoted Olivier to head coach on May 3, 1993. In 15 seasons at UCLA, Olivier went 232–208, with the program's first Pac-10 regular season title in 1999 and first Pac-10 Tournament title in 2006. UCLA made five NCAA Tournaments (1998–2000, 2004, 2006), with its most successful run being to the Elite Eight in 1999. Following a 16–15 season, Olivier resigned from UCLA on March 11, 2008.

=== Coach Nikki Fargas (2008-11) ===
Nikki Fargas was named the head coach at UCLA on April 17, 2008, with a five-year contract valued at nearly $1.5 million. In her first season, UCLA compiled a regular-season record of 18 wins and 11 losses. During the 2009–2010 season, UCLA placed second in the Pac-10 (25–9) and was defeated by second-ranked Stanford in the Pac-10 tournament.

=== Coach Cori Close (2011 - Present) ===
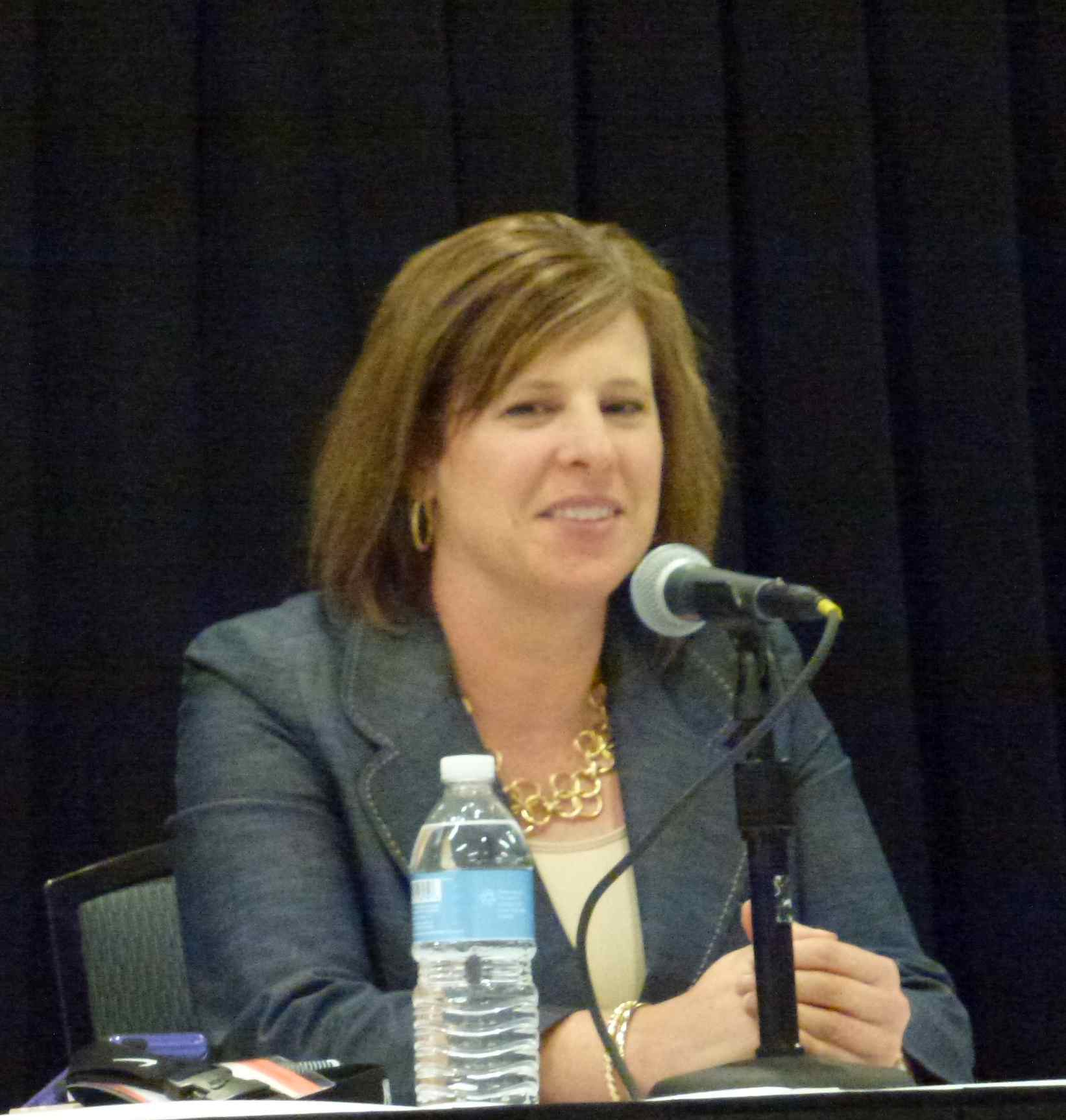
Cori Close, head coach of the UCLA women's basketball team, speaking at a WBCA conference in Nashville, Tennessee

Cori Close was named head coach on April 21, 2011. Close was on the Bruin coaching staff in for the 1993-94 and 1994-95 seasons, where she also formed a mentorship relationship with mens's coach emeritus, John Wooden.

==== 2024-25 Season: NCAA Final Four ====
The Bruins finished the 2024–25 season with a 34–3 record, including 16–2 in Big Ten play (both losses to rival USC) to finish in second place to USC. UCLA proceeded to beat USC 72–67 in the 2025 Big Ten conference tournament to win the championship. They were ranked No. 1 in the polls for the first time in program history. They received the number 1 overall seed in the 2025 NCAA Tournament and reached their first NCAA Final Four (Note: The UCLA Bruins women's basketball team has played in the semi-finals of the AIAW women's basketball tournament twice, winning the championship in 1978), where they were eliminated 85–51 by the eventual national champion UConn. A documentary named You See LA produced by Fox Sports was broadcast on March 1, 2026 on FS1 immediately following the 2026 UCLA-USC women's basketball game. The episode includes footage from games and post-game locker room team meetings, team gatherings, and interviews.

==== 2025-26 Season: 1st NCAA National Championship ====
The 2025–26 Bruins went 37–1 and won the program's second women's basketball national championship, and the first basketball championship in the NCAA era. The Bruins won the outright regular season Big Ten conference championship, going undefeated Seeded number 1 in the Big Ten tournament, the Bruins won all three games, concluding with a tournament record-setting 51-point win over number 8 ranked Iowa. For the NCAA tournament, the Bruins were the number 2 seed overall and number one in the Sacramento region. Reaching the Final Four, the Bruins won a re-match with the Texas Longhorns, the one loss they experienced all season, in a 51–44 victory. In a dominating performance, UCLA defeated South Carolina 79–51 in the national championship game. All six senior players were selected in the 2026 WNBA draft, five in the first round, setting a record.

== Venue ==
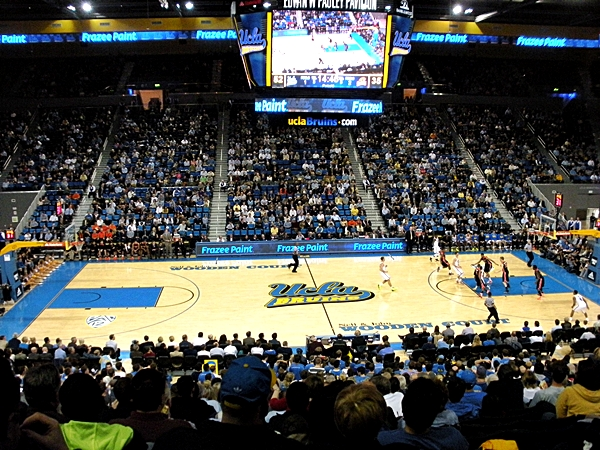
The newly renovated Pauley Pavilion is the home court of the basketball team

The Pauley Pavilion is UCLA's home venue. The building, designed by architect Welton Becket, was dedicated in June 1965, named for University of California Regent Edwin W. Pauley, who had matched the alumni contributions. Pauley donated almost one fifth of the more than $5 million spent in constructing the arena. The arena was renovated in 2010–12 and was reopened on November 9, 2012, when it hosted a men's basketball game against Indiana State.

The arena contains 11,307 permanent theater-style upholstered seats, plus retractable seats for 2,492 spectators (466 seats without backs used by the band and students), making a total basketball capacity of 13,800. When the floor seats are retracted, there is space for three full-sized basketball courts. These courts are used for team practice, intramural games, and pickup basketball games. It can also serve as a convention hall or large dining area when in this configuration.

Pauley Pavillion also serves as home venue to the men's and women's volleyball teams.

== Players ==
=== Current roster ===
2026–27 UCLA Bruins women's basketball team
Players
Coaches

Pos.	#	Name	Height	Year	Previous school	Hometown
G	3	Christina Karamouzi (injured)	6 ft 0 in (1.83 m)	So	KFUM Fryshuset Basket	Lulea, SE
F	30	Timea Gardiner	6 ft 3 in (1.91 m)	Sr	Oregon State	Ogden, UT
F	33	Amanda Muse	6 ft 4 in (1.93 m)	Sr	Heritage	Brentwood, CA
F	16	Sienna Betts	6 ft 4 in (1.93 m)	So	Grandview	Centennial, CO
G	9	Lena Bilić (injured)	6 ft 3 in (1.91 m)	So	XVI Gimnazija	Zagreb, HR
G	7	Elina Aarnisalo	5 ft 10 in (1.78 m)	Jr	North Carolina	Helsinki, FI
G	22	Bonnie Deas	5 ft 9 in (1.75 m)	So	Arkansas	Melbourne, VIC
G	4	Donovyn Hunter	6 ft 0 in (1.83 m)	Sr	TCU	Medford, OR
F	24	Addy Brown	6 ft 2 in (1.88 m)	Sr	Iowa State	Derby, KS
G	14	KK Bransford	5 ft 11 in (1.8 m)	Sr	Notre Dame	Cincinnati, OH
G	11	Somto Okafor	5 ft 9 in (1.75 m)	Fr	TBD	Barcelona, Spain
G	8	Lina Jerković	5 ft 9 in (1.75 m)	Fr	TBD	Rogaška Slatina, Slovenia

Head coach

- Cori Close (UC Santa Barbara)

Assistant coach(es)

- Michaela Onyenwere (UCLA)
- Tasha Brown (St. Ambrose)
- Tony Newman (UC Santa Barbara)
- Soh Matsuura (UCLA)
- James Clark

Legend

- (C) Team captain
- (S) Suspended
- (I) Ineligible
- (W) Walk-on
- Injured
- Current redshirt

Roster
Last update: April 9, 2025

== Notable players ==
=== Bruins in the WNBA ===
==== Drafted ====
Player	Draft	Seasons	Years
Rehema Stephens	1998 – 25th by Los Angeles	1	(1998) Last with Sacramento
Natalie Williams	1999 – 3rd by Utah	7	(1999–2005) Last with the Indiana Fever; Current Las Vegas Aces General Manager
Maylana Martin	2000 – 10th by Minnesota	2	(2000–2001) Last with the Minnesota Lynx
Nicole Kaczmarski	2003 – 39th by New York	0	-
Lisa Willis	2006 – 5th by Los Angeles	4	(2006-2009) Last with the Sacramento Monarchs
Nikki Blue	2006 – 19th by Washington	6	(2006-2010) Last with the New York Liberty
Noelle Quinn	2007 – 4th by Minnesota	12	(2007-2018) Last with the Seattle Storm; Former Seattle Storm Head Coach; WNBA Champion - Player; WNBA Champion - Coach
Lindsey Pluimer	2008 – 20th by Washington	0	-
Nirra Fields	2016 – 32nd by Phoenix	1	(2016) Last with the Phoenix Mercury
Jordin Canada	2018 – 5th by Seattle	6	(2018-Present) Currently with Atlanta; 2x WNBA Champion
Monique Billings	2018 – 15th by Atlanta	6	(2018-Present) Currently with Golden State
Kennedy Burke	2019 – 22nd by Dallas	4	(2019-2022) Last with Washington
Japreece Dean	2020 – 30th by Chicago	0	-
Michaela Onyenwere	2021 – 6th by New York	5	(2021-Present) Currently with Washington; WNBA Rookie of the Year
Charisma Osborne	2024 – 25th by Phoenix	2	(2024-Present) Currently with Phoenix
Lauren Betts	2026 – 4th by Washington	0	(2026-Present) Currently with Washington
Gabriela Jaquez	2026 – 5th by Chicago	0	(2026-Present) Currently with Chicago
Kiki Rice	2026 – 6th by Toronto	0	(2026-Present) Currently with Toronto
Angela Dugalić	2026 – 9th by Washington	0	(2026-Present) Currently with Washington
Gianna Kneepkens	2026 – 15th by Connecticut	0	(2026-Present) Currently with Connecticut
Charlisse Leger-Walker	2026 – 18th by Connecticut	0	(2026-Present) Currently with Connecticut

==== Undrafted ====
Player	Seasons	Years
Sandra Van Embricqs	1	(1998) Last with Los Angeles
Michelle Greco	1	(2004) Last with Seattle; WNBA Champion

=== Other Players ===
- Denise Curry
- Jackie Joyner-Kersee
- Ann Meyers, Phoenix Mercury Vice President
- Natalie Nakase, Golden State Valkyries Head Coach
- Teiko Nishi
- Anita Ortega

=== Retired numbers ===
No.	Player	Pos.	Tenure	No. Ret.	Ref.
12	Denise Curry	C	1977–81	1990	
15	Ann Meyers	SG	1974–78	1990	

== Year by year results ==
Conference tournament winners noted with # Source

Season	Team	Overall	Conference	Standing	Postseason	Coaches' poll	AP poll
Kenny Washington (Independent, SCWIAC) (1974–1975)
1974–75	Kenny Washington	18–4	9–1	1st (SCWIAC)	NWIT Second Place		
Kenny Washington:		18–4	9–1				
Ellen Mosher (Independent, SCWIAC) (1975–1977)
1975–76	Ellen Mosher	19–4	12–1	1st	AIAW West Regional, NWIT Second Place		
1976–77	Ellen Mosher	20–3	7–1	1st	AIAW West Regional, NWIT Second Place		13
Ellen Mosher:		39–7	19–2				
Billie Moore (Independent, WCAA, Pac-12) (1977–1993)
1977-78	Billie Moore	27–3	8–0	1st (WCAA)	AIAW Champions		5
1978–79	Billie Moore	24–10	7–1	1st	AIAW Third Place		6
1979–80	Billie Moore	18–12	9–3	2nd	AIAW West Regional		
1980–81	Billie Moore	29–7	9–3	2nd	AIAW Quarterfinals		7
1981–82	Billie Moore	16–14	7–5	4th			
1982–83	Billie Moore	18–11	9–5	3rd	NCAA First Round		
1983–84	Billie Moore	17–12	6–8	5th			
1984–85	Billie Moore	20–10	10–4	2nd	NCAA Sixteen		18
1985–86	Billie Moore	12–16	3–5	4th			
Pac-12 Conference
1986–87	Billie Moore	18–10	11–7	4th (Pac-12)			
1987–88	Billie Moore	19–11	12–6	4th			
1988–89	Billie Moore	12–16	8–10	4th			
1989–90	Billie Moore	17–12	12–6	3rd	NCAA First Round		
1990–91	Billie Moore	15–13	10–8	T-4th			
1991–92	Billie Moore	21–10	12–6	T-3rd	NCAA Sixteen	18	
1992–93	Billie Moore	13–14	8–10	7th			
Billie Moore:		296–181	141–87				
Kathy Olivier (Pac-12) (1993–2008)
1993–94	Kathy Olivier	15–12	10–8	5th			
1994–95	Kathy Olivier	10–17	5–13	T-8th			
1995–96	Kathy Olivier	13–14	8–10	T-6th			
1996–97	Kathy Olivier	13–14	7–11	6th			
1997–98	Kathy Olivier	20–9	14–4	T-2nd	NCAA Second Round	20	25
1998–99	Kathy Olivier	26–8	15–3	T-1st	NCAA Quarterfinals	15	15
1999–2000	Kathy Olivier	18–11	12–6	4th	NCAA First Round		
2000–01	Kathy Olivier	6–23	5–13	10th			
2001–02	Kathy Olivier	9–20	4–14	8th			
2002–03	Kathy Olivier	18–11	12–6	4th			
2003–04	Kathy Olivier	17–13	11–7	T-3rd	NCAA First Round		
2004–05	Kathy Olivier	16–12	10–8	6th			
2005–06	Kathy Olivier	21–11	12–6	3rd#	NCAA Second Round	18	21
2006–07	Kathy Olivier	14–18	7–11	7th			
2007–08	Kathy Olivier	16–15	10–8	T-4th			
Kathy Olivier:		232–208	142–128				
Nikki Fargas (Pac-12) (2008–2011)
2008–09	Nikki Fargas	19–12	9–9	T-4th			
2009–10	Nikki Fargas	25–9	15–3	2nd	NCAA Second Round	23	22
2010–11	Nikki Fargas	28–5	16–2	2nd	NCAA Second Round	13	7
Nikki Fargas:		72–26	40–14				
Cori Close (Pac-12) (2011–2024)
2011–12	Cori Close	14–16	9–9	T-5th			
2012–13	Cori Close	26–8	14–4	3rd	NCAA Second Round	12	11
2013–14	Cori Close	13–18	7–11	8th			
2014–15	Cori Close	19–18	8–10	6th	WNIT champions		
2015–16	Cori Close	26–9	14–4	T-3rd	NCAA Sweet Sixteen	10	13
2016–17	Cori Close	25–9	13–5	4th	NCAA Sweet Sixteen	15	13
2017–18	Cori Close	27–8	14–4	T-3rd	NCAA Elite Eight	9	9
2018–19	Cori Close	22–13	12–6	4th	NCAA Sweet Sixteen	20	14
2019–20	Cori Close	26–5	14–4	T-2nd	Tournament cancelled	10	9
2020–21	Cori Close	17–6	12–4	3rd	NCAA Second Round	9	12
2021–22	Cori Close	18–13	8–8	7th	WNIT semifinals		
2022–23	Cori Close	27–10	11–7	T-4th	NCAA Sweet Sixteen	14	13
2023–24	Cori Close	27–7	13–5	T-2nd	NCAA Sweet Sixteen	6	6
Cori Close (Big Ten) (2024–present)
2024–25	Cori Close	34–3	16–2	2nd	NCAA Final Four	3	3
2025–26	Cori Close	37–1	18–0	1st	NCAA Champions	1	1
Cori Close:		358–144	Pac-12: 149–81; Big Ten: 71–4				
Total:		1020–570					
National champion Postseason invitational champion Conference regular season champion Conference regular season and conference tournament champion Division regular season champion Division regular season and conference tournament champion Conference tournament champion

== Postseason results ==
=== NCAA Division I ===
UCLA has reached the NCAA Division I women's basketball tournament 21 times. They have a record of 33–20.

Year	Seed	Round	Opponent	Result
1983	#6	First Round	#3 Oregon State	L 62–75
1985	#6	First Round; Sweet Sixteen	#3 Washington #2 Georgia	W 78–62; L 42–78
1990	#10	First Round	#7 Arkansas	L 80–90 (OT)
1992	#5	First Round; Second Round; Sweet Sixteen	#12 Notre Dame #4 Texas #8 SW Missouri State	W 93–72; W 82–81; L 57–83
1998	#7	First Round; Second Round	#10 Michigan #2 Alabama	W 65–58; L 74–75
1999	#3	First Round; Second Round; Sweet Sixteen; Elite Eight	#14 UW–Green Bay #6 Kentucky #2 Colorado State #1 Louisiana Tech	W 76–69; W 87–63; W 77–68; L 62–88
2000	#10	First Round	#7 George Washington	L 72–79
2004	#10	First Round	#7 Minnesota	L 81–92
2006	#5	First Round; Second Round	#12 Bowling Green #4 Purdue	W 74–61; L 54–61
2010	#8	First Round; Second Round	#9 NC State #1 Nebraska	W 74–54; L 70–83
2011	#3	First Round; Second Round	#14 Montana #11 Gonzaga	W 55–47; L 75–89
2013	#3	First Round; Second Round	#14 Stetson #6 Oklahoma	W 66–49; L 72–85
2016	#3	First Round; Second Round; Sweet Sixteen	#14 Hawaii #6 South Florida #2 Texas	W 66–50; W 72–67; L 64–72
2017	#4	First Round; Second Round; Sweet Sixteen	#13 Boise State #5 Texas A&M #1 Connecticut	W 83–56; W 75–43; L 71–86
2018	#3	First Round; Second Round; Sweet Sixteen; Elite Eight	#14 American #11 Creighton #2 Texas #1 Mississippi State	W 71–60; W 86–64; W 84–75; L 73–89
2019	#6	First Round; Second Round; Sweet Sixteen	#11 Tennessee #3 Maryland #2 Connecticut	W 89–77; W 85–80; L 61–69
2021	#3	First Round; Second Round	#14 Wyoming #6 Texas	W 69–48; L 62–71
2023	#4	First Round; Second Round; Sweet Sixteen	#13 Sacramento State #5 Oklahoma #1 South Carolina	W 67–45; W 82–73; L 43-59
2024	#2	First Round; Second Round; Sweet Sixteen	#15 California Baptist #7 Creighton #3 LSU	W 84–55; W 67–63; L 69-78
2025	#1	First Round; Second Round; Sweet Sixteen; Elite Eight; Final Four	#16 Southern #8 Richmond #5 Ole Miss #3 LSU #2 UConn	W 84–46; W 84–67; W 76–62; W 72–65; L 51–85
2026	#1	First Round; Second Round; Sweet Sixteen; Elite Eight; Final Four; National Championship	#16 California Baptist #8 Oklahoma State #4 Minnesota #3 Duke #1 Texas #1 South Carolina	W 96–43; W 87–68; W 80–56; W 70–58; W 51–44; W 79–51

=== AIAW Division I ===
The Bruins made three appearances in sectionals and finals of the AIAW National Division I basketball tournament, with a combined record of 8–3.

Year	Round	Opponent	Result
1978	First Round; Quarterfinals; Semifinals; National Championship	BYU; Stephen F. Austin; Montclair State; Maryland	W 96–75; W 69–51; W 87–82; W 75–65
1979	First Round; Quarterfinals; Semifinals; Third Place	Oregon State; Wayland Baptist; Old Dominion; Tennessee	W 105–70; W 92–73; L 82–87; L 86–104
1981	First Round; Second Round; Quarterfinals	Oregon State; Kansas; Louisiana Tech	W 72–65; W 73–71; L 54–87

The Bruins have also appeared in the Western Regionals of the AIAW playoffs in 1976, 1977, and 1980.

== Player and coach awards ==
- Naismith Women’s College Defensive Player of the Year

Lauren Betts – 2025

=== National coach awards ===
- Naismith College Coach of the Year

Cori Close – 2025

- WBCA National Coach of the Year

Cori Close – 2025

- WBCA Assistant Coach of the Year

Tony Newnan – 2025

== Cited works and published references ==
- Porter, David L., ed. (2005). Basketball: A Biographical Dictionary. Greenwood Press. ISBN 978-0-313-30952-6.
