= Anita Ortega =

American basketball player and law enforcement officer

Personal information
- Born: July 12, 1957 (age 69)
- Listed height: 5 ft 8 in (1.73 m)

Career information
- High school: Los Angeles High School (Los Angeles, California)
- College: UCLA (1975–1979)
- Position: Guard

Career history

Playing
- 1979–1981: San Francisco Pioneers
- 1981: Minnesota Fillies

Career highlights
- WBL All-Star (1980); WBL All-Pro (1980); AIAW national champion (1978)
- Stats at Basketball Reference

Anita Ortega (born July 12, 1957) is an American-Puerto Rican former basketball player and law enforcement officer. She played college basketball at UCLA where she won the 1978 AIAW championship. She later played professionally in the Women's Professional Basketball League before starting a career as a law enforcement officer with the Los Angeles Police Department.

== Basketball career ==
=== College career ===
Ortega was a four-year starter at UCLA from 1975 to 1979. During her junior year, she won the 1978 AIAW championship as a member of the 1977–78 UCLA Bruins women's basketball team. In that game, Ortega recorded a team high 23 points.

=== Professional career ===
Ortega played in the Women's Professional Basketball League (WBL), the first women's professional basketball league in the United States, from 1979 to 1981. During her first season with the San Francisco Pioneers, she averaged 24.1 points 5.2 assists per game and was selected both to the All-Pro team and to the 1980 WBL All-Star Game. In 1981, she was traded to the Minnesota Fillies.

=== National team career ===
In 1979, she played in the Pan American Games, representing Puerto Rico.

== Later life ==
After the WBL folded in 1981, Ortega returned to the UCLA Bruins women's basketball team as an assistant coach from 1981-83. She left coaching to attend the police academy and later served in the Los Angeles Police Department (LAPD) from 1984 until her retirement in 2016. She was the first black female promoted to captain and first black female Area Commanding Officer in LAPD history.

== Statistics ==
=== College statistics ===
Legend
GP	Games played	GS	Games started	MPG	Minutes per game
FG%	Field goal percentage	3P%	3-point field goal percentage	FT%	Free throw percentage
RPG	Rebounds per game	APG	Assists per game	SPG	Steals per game
BPG	Blocks per game	PPG	Points per game	**Bold**	Career high

Year	Team	GP	Points	FG%	FT%	RPG	APG	SPG	BPG	PPG
1978-79	UCLA	**34**	**548**	43.3%	**69.4%**	5.0	**3.8**	**2.5**	**0.8**	16.1
1977-78	UCLA	29	535	**49.9%**	61.3%	4.4	3.7	2.2	0.3	**18.4**
1976-77	UCLA	23	340	45.4%	61.7%	**5.8**	1.7	2.0	0.1	14.8
1975-76	UCLA	23	328	44.7%	61.8%	5.6	1.8	2.0	0.3	14.3
Career	UCLA	109	1751	45.9%	64.1%	5.1	2.9	2.2	0.4	16.1
