= Open Roberta =

Project within the German education initiative "Roberta – Learning with robots"

- Paradigm: event-driven, imperative
- Designed by: Beate Jost, Reinhard Budde, Thorsten Leimbach, Achim Kapusta
- Developer: Fraunhofer IAIS, Media Engineering Department
- First appeared: 2013; 13 years ago (test) 2014; 12 years ago (official)
- Stable release: 5.2.0 / May 10, 2023; 3 years ago
- Typing discipline: dynamic
- Implementation language: Java, JavaScript, HTML (NEPO)
- OS: Windows, Linux, iOS
- License: Apache License 2
- Website: www.open-roberta.org

Influenced by
- Scratch, Blockly

Open Roberta is a project within the German education initiative "Roberta – Learning with robots", initiated by Fraunhofer IAIS, which is an institute belonging to the Fraunhofer Society. With Open Roberta Fraunhofer IAIS is looking to encourage children to code by using robots such as Lego Mindstorms, and other programmable hardware systems such as Arduino, BBC Micro-Bit, and the Calliope mini. The Cloud-approach of the Open Roberta Lab is intended to simplify programming concepts and make it easier for teachers and schools to teach how to code. Open Roberta is free and does not require any installation. The project was initially founded with €1m by Google.org. Users from up to 120 countries now access the platform.

== Open Roberta Lab ==
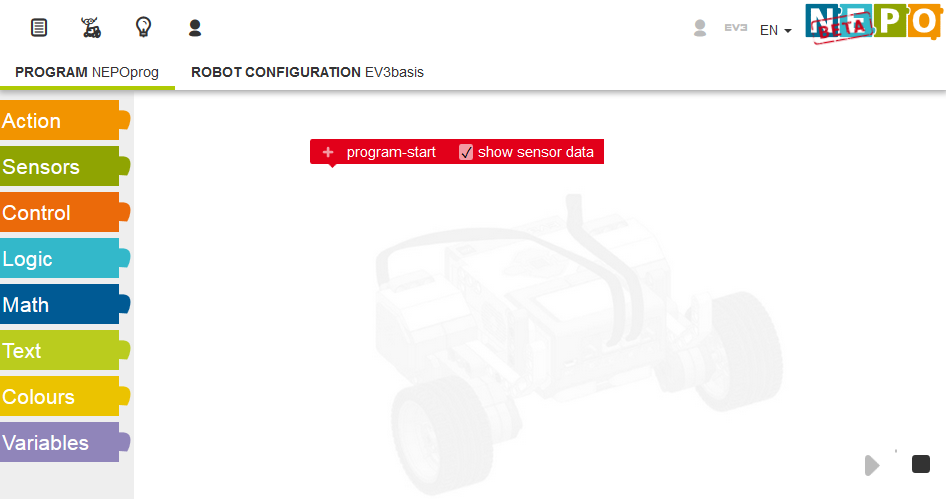
Open Roberta Lab.

Open Roberta Lab is cloud-based programming environment and is the user-facing middleware in a chain of software and firmware bits that make a robot work in a classroom environment. This environment allows children and young people with no technical pre-knowledge to program a LEGO MINDSTORMS EV3 and NXT robot, as well as the Arduino based robot Bot'n Roll ONE A, the BBC micro:bit, and the Calliope mini. As of the release 2.3.0, the microboard B-O-B-3 and as of release 3.0 the microboards Arduino Uno, Arduino Nano and Arduino Mega can also be programmed using Open Roberta. There is a variety of different program blocks available to program the motors, sensors, and the EV3 brick. Open Roberta Lab uses the approach of visual programming. This approach makes it easier, especially for beginners with no experience, to learn how to code. As a cloud based programming environment no installation is needed and any operating system (Mac OS, Windows, Linux) and computer hardware device may be used. One of the advantages of Open Roberta Lab is that it can be used with any device (PC, tablet, smartphone); only a web browser is needed. The Lab can be used without registration, and no user account is needed. As of the release 2.2.1, the Linux-based operating system EV3dev is officially supported for the LEGO MINDSTORMS EV3 robot. Open Roberta Lab is available in the following languages: Catalan, Czech, Danish, Dutch, English, Finnish, French, German, Italian, Polish, Portuguese, Russian, Spanish and Turkish always in school students.

== Open source community ==
The programming platform Open Roberta Lab is open source developed. Both the software as well as the open source development tools are available on a server of Fraunhofer Society. The development team at Fraunhofer works together with teachers and education experts from the Roberta network. Therefore, also universities and students are involved in the development. It should address especially female students - the guiding principle of the Roberta project.

== Programming language NEPO® ==
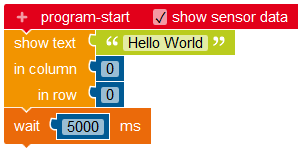
NEPO program Hello World.

NEPO is a free open source meta programming language that can be used by students, scholars, teachers, and other interested persons within the Open Roberta Lab. NEPO translates to New Easy Programming Online (or simply OPEN read backwards). NEPO is the name of the graphical programming language and its coupled hardware connection layer. NEPO uses the freely available Blockly library. In addition within NEPO there are additional functionalities and improvements which have been adapted for Open Roberta. The programming paradigm of NEPO is inspired by Scratch, which was developed by the Massachusetts Institute of Technology. A NEPO block always represents and encapsulates a certain robot functionality. A blocks feature set can easily be recognized through the associated block category, for example »sensors«. Programming with NEPO follows a simple principle. The blocks are interconnected and will be executed by the robot according to their order. This principle is called "sequential operation."

=== NEPO block categories ===
All available blocks are listed and categorized as the Action, Sensors, Control, Logic, Math, Text, Colours, Variables, Functions, and Messages as shown in the table below.

Category	Notes	Category	Notes
Action	Includes blocks for the robot to be performed directly.	Text	Includes blocks to write strings on the robot display.
Sensors	Contains blocks for all standard sensors of the EV3 system.	Colours	Standard colour blocks to compare sensor inputs.
Control	Includes blocks for the program sequence control. The category includes the following blocks: If .. do, If .. do .. else, repeat indefinitely, repeat .. times, wait .. ms, wait until ..	Variables	Local and global variables can be defined.
Logic	With the »logic« blocks, conditions can be created. With this condition you can interrelate states, values, and events with each other.	Functions	Functions with input and output parameters can be defined.
Math	Mathematical operators and parameter blocks.	Messages	Includes blocks to send and receive bluetooth messages.
List	Includes blocks to create a list and to search or sort list elements.	program-start	Each program starts with this block. This block is always available in the workspace.
Neuronal Networks	Includes blocks for coding a neuronal network.		

=== NEPO input / output connector ===
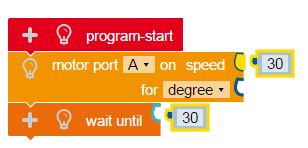
NEPO typ check input connectors.

Depending on the block different values can be passed to a block. The type of the value can be identified by the colored compounds (called including »connectors«) of a block. In the chapter »block category« you can see the different values a block may have. Only if the colors of the input and the output connector match, these blocks can be connected.

A block may optionally also pass a value to another block. These blocks have colored output connectors. Only if the colors of the input and the output connector are the same, these blocks can be connected.

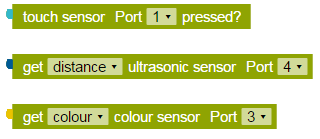
NEPO typ check output connectors.

In total there are six input and output types within NEPO. These types can have the following values:

- Logical value (light blue)
- Number (dark Blue)
- String / Text (green)
- Colour (yellow)
- List (purple)
- Connection (pink)

== Artificial neural networks ==
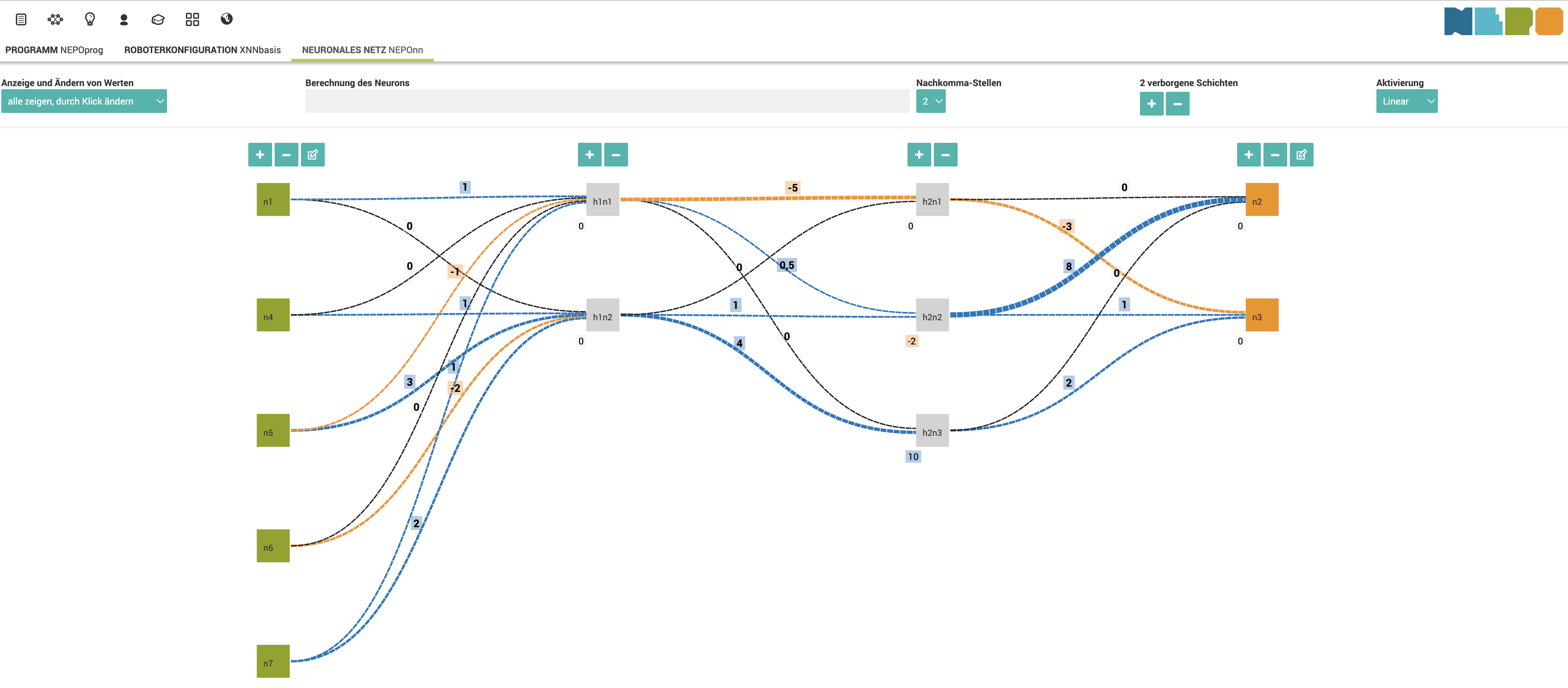
Integrating artificial neural networks into the Open Roberta Lab.

Since August 2022, the Open Roberta Lab offers the functionality to program artificial neural networks. With this integration, the topic "Artificial Intelligence" was integrated into the Open Roberta Lab. This is done along the framework curriculum for computer science in North Rhine-Westphalia. The project is funded by the Ministry for School and Education of North Rhine-Westphalia. The graphical integration enables a low-threshold access. The feature makes AI algorithms intuitively experienceable and understandable through graphical programming. The goal is for students from grades 5 and 6 to understand what an artificial neural network is and how it works. They also learn to program themselves, for example to enable a robot to move independently in its environment.

The structure and functioning of simple neural networks can be understood step by step. The networks programmed by the students can be tested directly in the 2D simulation provided in the Open Roberta Lab, so that the children receive immediate feedback. Once the basics are understood, students can train the artificial neural network. A robot can thus be "taught" to avoid obstacles, as vacuum cleaner robots do, for example.

== Open Roberta Simulator ==
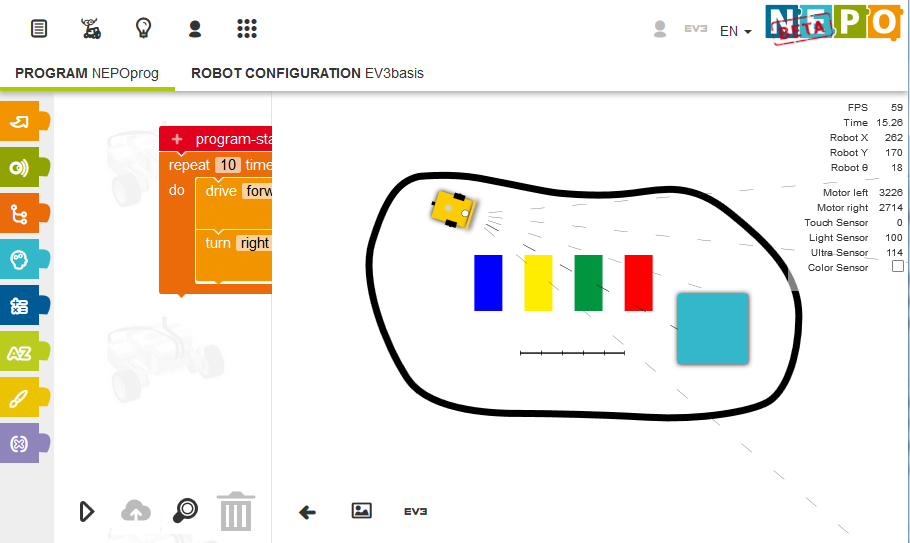
Open Roberta 2D simulation of a wheeled robot.

Since version beta 1.3.0 the Open Roberta Lab also offers a simulation environment. This is a simulation of a two-dimensional robot model equipped with two wheels (differential drive). To program the simulated robot also the programming language NEPO may be used. The simulated 2D model includes the simulation of an ultrasonic sensor, a touch sensor, a color sensor and the display of an LED. In addition, different environments can be chosen. Since version beta 1.4.0 NEPO blocks can be used without any changes for the 2D-Simulation and the real robot.

== Open Roberta Gallery ==
As of release 2.3.0, the "Gallery" is available, allowing users to share their own programs with everyone else. Logged-in users with a verified account can share their programs by clicking "edit" in the menu bar, followed by a click on the menu point "my programs." In the following overview of the programs saved online, they then just have to click on the gallery-icon on the right-hand side.

In order to load a program off the Gallery, users – logged in or not – double-click on the chosen program and are then able to view, change or download its content.

== Integrated Systems ==
System	Programming Language	Simulation	Transfer	Compiler
Arduino	C/C++	no	USB	arduino-builder
micro:bit	MicroPython	yes	USB	
micro:bit V2	MicroPython	yes	USB	
Bionic Flower	C/C++	no	USB	
Bionics Kit	C/C++	no	USB	
BOB3	C/C++	no	USB, Bluetooth	C/C++
Bot'n'Roll	C/C++	no	USB	arduino-builder
CalliBot	C	yes	USB, Bluetooth	
Calliope mini	C/C++	yes	USB, Bluetooth	
Edison	MicroPython	no	Audio	
Lego Mindstorms NXT	NXC	yes	USB	NXC
Lego Mindstroms EV3	C, Java, Python	yes	USB, WLan	arm-linux, Java
Lego WeDo	Token basiert	no	Bluetooth	Lego Original
mBot	C++	yes	USB	arduino-builder
mBot 2	Python	no	USB	arduino-builder
NAO	Python	yes	WLan, Ethernet	
ROB3RTA	C/C++	yes	USB, Bluetooth	C/C++
senseBox	C/C++	no	USB	arduino-builder
Thymio	Aseba	yes	USB, Bluetooth	Aseba

== History ==
Open Roberta is a technological extension of the "Roberta concept". Roberta (short for: "Roberta – Learning with robots") is a Fraunhofer education initiative founded in 2002 by the Germany Ministry of Education and Research. Since 2002 over 350,000 students have participated in Roberta courses.

== Awards ==
Open Roberta was awarded the "Bundessieger 2015" at the challenge "Germany Land of Ideas" in the education category. In 2016, Open Roberta won the bitkom award "d-elina" in the professional category.
