= 1977–78 UCLA Bruins women's basketball team =

American college basketball season

1977–78 UCLA Bruins women's basketball

AIAW, Reg. 8, WCAA
- Conference: Western Collegiate Athletic Association

Ranking
- AP: No. 5
- Record: 27-3 (8-0 1st WCAA)
- Head coach: Billie Moore (1st season)
- Assistant coach: Colleen Matsuhara
- Home arena: Pauley Pavilion

1977–78 West Coast Athletic Association women's basketball standings
	Conf.				Overall
Team	W		L	PCT	W		L	PCT
No. 5 UCLA	8	–	0	1.000	27	–	3	.900
Cal State Fullerton	5	–	3	.625	16	–	9	.640
No. 20 Long Beach State	4	–	4	.500	18	–	9	.667
USC	3	–	5	.375	11	–	13	.458
San Diego State	0	–	8	.000	10	–	18	.357
As of March 15, 1978; Rankings from Poll

The 1977–78 UCLA Bruins women's basketball team represented the University of California, Los Angeles during the 1977-78 AIAW women's basketball season. This was the fourth season of competition in women's basketball for UCLA. The Bruins, headed by first-year coach Billie Moore, played their home games at Pauley Pavilion. and were members of the Western Collegiate Athletic Association. Led by senior Ann Meyers, freshman Denise Curry and junior Anita Ortega, the Bruins finished the season with a 27–3 record. They won the WCAA conference title with an undefeated 8–0 record. The team won the 1978 AIAW National Large College Basketball Championship on March 25, 1978, the first National Championship for the Bruins in women's basketball.

The Bruins began 1978 with a number of games on the East coast, including the inaugural Madison Square Garden Invitational over New Year's weekend. They lost to defending national champion and number 2 ranked Delta State in the first game. A later road trip brought them to Maryland, for the first meeting with the Terrapins, which the Bruins lost. Returning to California, the Bruins won the rest of their regular season games and advanced to the AIAW regionals.

In the AIAW semifinal game, the Bruins faced one of the greatest scorers in the history of women's basketball, Carol Blazejowski and the Montclair State team. The Bruins won 85-77, even with Blazejowski scoring 40 points. Three Bruin players recorded double-doubles: Denise Curry with 22 points and 14 rebounds, Heidi Nestor with 22 points and 10 rebounds, and Ann Meyers with 19 points and 14 rebounds. In the national championship game, the Bruins defeated Maryland 90–74, in front of a record crowd of 9,351 at Pauley Pavilion for the 1978 AIAW National Large College Basketball Championship. Meyers had 20 points, 10 rebounds, nine assists and eight steals. Ortega recorded a team high 23 points.

The 1978 national championship represented a shift from the smaller schools to larger schools with larger athletic budgets such as UCLA and Maryland It was pivotal in terms of hosting, organization, format, television rights, and attendance. The NCAA Division I women's basketball tournament, which was first played at the end of the 1981-82 women's basketball season, would prevail as the season-completing tournament for women's college basketball. Ann Meyers being the first woman to receive a four-year athletic scholarship is regarded as one of the defining moments in the history of women's sports.

== Previous season ==
Under previous head coach Ellen Mosher the Bruins won the WCAA with a 7–1 record. The largest win of the season was over number 5 ranked Cal State Fullerton coached by Billie Moore, which was the first Bruin win over a top ten ranked team. Moore's Fullerton teams had won the WCAA conference each of the previous 7 seasons. Overall the Bruins finished with a 16–1 regular season record and an invitation to the 1977 AIAW National Large College Basketball Championship. They lost in the regionals to the same Cal State Fullerton team with whom they had split the regular season conference games. Subsequently, the Bruins were invited to the 1978 National Women's Invitational Tournament (NWIT). Advancing to the finals of the NWIT, they lost to Number 7 ranked Wayland Baptist in the championship game. Their win loss record was 20–3. In April, Mosher resigned and Moore was hired as the new head coach. Mosher took a job as the coach of the Minnesota Golden Gophers women's basketball team.

== Roster ==
1977–78 UCLA Bruins women's basketball team
Players
Coaches

Pos.	#	Name	Height	Year	Previous school	Hometown
F	15	Ann Meyers	5 ft 9 in (1.75 m)	Sr	Sonora HS	La Habra, CA
F	12	Denise Curry	6 ft 1 in (1.85 m)	Fr	Davis HS	Davis, CA
G	31	Dianne Frierson	5 ft 6 in (1.68 m)	So	Hillwood HS	Nashville, TN
G	11	Anita Ortega	5 ft 8 in (1.73 m)	Jr	Los Angeles HS	Los Angeles, CA
F	13	Denise Corlett	5 ft 11 in (1.8 m)	So
G	21	Beth Moore	—	Jr
C	24	Heidi Nestor	6 ft 1 in (1.85 m)	Sr	Granada Hills HS	Los Angeles, CA
	30	Tem Breckenridge	—
F	10	Debbie Willie	5 ft 9 in (1.75 m)	Fr	San Marcos HS	Santa Barbara, CA
	20	Janet Hopkins	—	Fr

Head coach

- Billie Moore

Assistant coach(es)

- Colleen Matsuhara

Legend

- (C) Team captain
- (S) Suspended
- (I) Ineligible
- (W) Walk-on
- Injured
- Current redshirt

Roster
Last update: 2026-03-28

Ann Meyers was the first player to be offered a four-year scholarship in 1974. All the players on the team had financial assistance by this season.

== Schedule ==
Date time, TV	Rank^{#}	Opponent^{#}	Result	Record	High points	High rebounds	High assists	Site (attendance) city, state
Regular season
December 8, 1977*	No. 7	San Jose State	W 85-70	1-0	– -	– -	– -	Pauley Pavilion; Los Angeles, CA
December 17, 1977*	No. 8	Arizona State	W 106-69	2-0	– -	– -	– -	Los Angeles, CA
December 20, 1977*	No. 8	Utah State	W 125-62	3-0	– -	– -	– -	Los Angeles, CA
December 22, 1977*	No. 7	BYU	W 116-62	4-0	– -	– -	– -	Los Angeles, CA
January 1, 1978*	No. 7	vs. No. 2 Delta State @ New York; Madison Square Garden Invitational	L 78-84	4-1	– -	– -	– -	Madison Square Garden (5,181); New York, NY
January 2, 1978*	No. 7	vs. No. 18 Rutgers @ New York; Madison Square Garden Invitational	W 104-77	5-1	– -	– -	– -	Madison Square Garden; New York, NY
January 4, 1978*	No. 7	at No. 10 Maryland	L 88-92	5-2	– -	– -	– -	Cole Field House; College Park, MD
January 6, 1978*	No. 7	vs. Kentucky @ Raleigh; Wolfpack Doubleheaders	W 97-72	6-2	– -	– -	– -	Reynolds Coliseum; Raleigh, NC
January 7, 1978*	No. 7	at No. 5 North Carolina State; Wolfpack Doubleheaders	L 81-91	6-3	– -	– -	– -	Reynolds Coliseum; Raleigh, NC
January 18, 1978	No. 11	at Long Beach State	W 107-94	7-3 (1-0)	– -	– -	– -	West Gym; Long Beach, CA
January 20, 1978*	No. 11	Kansas State	W 123-62	8-3	– -	– -	– -	Los Angeles, CA
January 25, 1978	No. 9	Cal State Fullerton	W 101-55	9-3 (2-0)	– -	– -	– -	Los Angeles, CA
January 28, 1978	No. 9	at San Diego State	W 96-49	10-3 (3-0)	– -	– -	– -	San Diego, CA
February 1, 1978	No. 9	USC; UCLA-USC rivalry	W 88-63	11-3 (4-0)	– -	– -	– -	Los Angeles, CA
February 8, 1978	No. 9	Long Beach State	W 94-65	12-3 (5-0)	– -	– -	– -	Los Angeles, CA
February 10, 1978*	No. 9	at San Francisco State	W 109-40	13-3	– -	– -	– -	San Francisco, CA
February 11, 1978*	No. 9	at Stanford	W 99-69	14-3	– -	– -	– -	Stanford, CA
February 14, 1978*	No. 9	Cal Poly Pomona	W 99-72	15-3	– -	– -	– -	Los Angeles, CA
February 16, 1978	No. 9	at Cal State Fullerton	W 100-73	16-3 (6-0)	– -	– -	– -	Fullerton, CA
February 18, 1978*	No. 9	Stephen F. Austin	W 85-74	17-3	– -	– -	– -	Los Angeles, CA
February 22, 1978	No. 8	San Diego State	W 104-44	18-3 (7-0)	– -	– -	– -	Los Angeles, CA
March 1, 1978*	No. 8	at Cal Poly Pomona	W 101-72	19-3	– -	– -	– -	Pomona, CA
March 3, 1978	No. 8	at USC; UCLA-USC rivalry	W 78-50	20-3 (8-0)	– -	– -	– -	Los Angeles, CA
AIAW Region 8 tournament
March 9, 1978	No. 7	@ Stanford	W 80-54	21-3	– -	– -	– -	Stanford, CA
March 10, 1978	No. 7	vs. Long Beach State	W 79-78	22-3	– -	– -	– -	Stanford, CA
March 11, 1978	No. 7	vs. No. 17 UNLV	W 100-88	23-3	– -	– -	– -	Stanford, CA
AIAW Sectionals
March 17, 1978; 7:00pm	No. 5	vs. BYU	W 102-57	24-3	– -	– -	– -	West Gym; Long Beach, CA
March 18, 1978	No. 5	vs. No. 14 Stephen F. Austin	W 86-60	25-3	– -	– -	– -	West Gym; Long Beach, CA
AIAW Final Four
March 23, 1978	No. 5	No. 4 Montclair State; AIAW National Semifinal	W 85-77	26-3	22 – Tied	14 – Tied	8 – Meyers	Pauley Pavilion (7,822); Los Angeles, CA
March 25, 1978; NBC	No. 5	No. 6 Maryland; AIAW National Championship	W 90-74	27-3	23 – Ortega	11 – Corlett	9 – Meyers	Pauley Pavilion (9,351); Los Angeles, CA
*Non-conference game. ^{#}Rankings from AP Poll. (#) Tournament seedings in parentheses. All times are in Pacific Time. Source:

== Awards and Honors ==
- February 18, 1978 - In the game against Stephen F. Austin Ann Meyers recorded the first quadruple-double in NCAA Division I basketball history, with 20 points, 14 rebounds, 10 assists and 10 steals.
- WCAA Championship undefeated (8–0)
- AIAW Championship
- Ann Meyers was named to the Kodak First-team all America team for the fourth time
- Bruins on the All-WCAA conference teams: Ann Meyers (1st Team), Denise Curry (1st Team), Anita Ortega (1st Team), Heidi Nestor (2nd Team)
- A number of single season and individual program records set in 1977-78 still stood until the 2024–25 and 2025-26 UCLA Bruins seasons
  - Season Field goal percentage: .621 (Denise Curry, since eclipsed by Lauren Betts with .648 in the 2025-26 season)
  - Points by a freshman: 610 (Denise Curry)
  - Steals: 125 (Ann Meyers)
  - Winning streak: 28 into the 1978–79 season (31 is the Bruin winning streak at the start of the 2026-27 season)
  - Team Field goals made: 1,216 (team, eclipsed by the 2025-26 team with 1,226)
  - Conference winning percentage: 1.000 (8–0, tied by the 2025-26 team with a Big Ten record of 18-0)
  - Scoring average per game: 96.2
  - Opponent Field Goal percentage .355 (the 2025-26 team is in second place with .358)
- The attendance of 9,351 for the AIAW championship game stood as the record for a UCLA women's basketball game in Pauley Pavilion until the 1999 USC game.
- Victories over the two top ten teams in the finals were the second and third such wins in the history of the Bruin women's basketball team, and the first in post-season play.

== See also ==
- 1977-78 UCLA Bruins men's basketball team
