= Billie Moore =

American basketball coach (1943–2022)

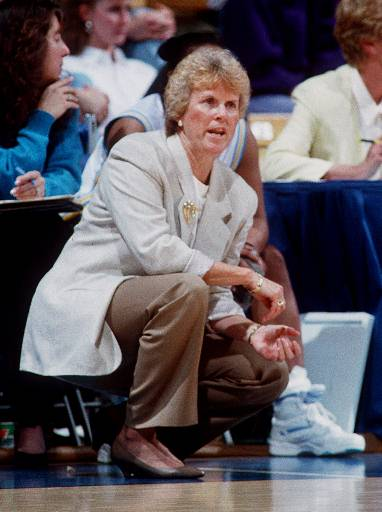
- Moore in 1993

Biographical details
- Born: May 5, 1943; Humansville, Missouri, U.S.
- Died: December 14, 2022 (aged 79); Fullerton, California, U.S.

Coaching career (HC unless noted)
- 1969–1977: Cal State Fullerton
- 1977–1993: UCLA

Head coaching record
- Overall: 436–196

Accomplishments and honors

Championships
- AIAW national (1978); CIAW national (1970)
- Basketball Hall of Fame; Inducted in 1999
- Women's Basketball Hall of Fame
Medal record
Women's Basketball
Assistant coach for United States
Pan American Games
Gold medal – first place	1975 Mexico City	Team competition
Assistant coach for United States
World University Games
Silver medal – second place	1973 Moscow	Team competition
Head coach for United States
Olympic Games
Silver medal – second place	1976 Montreal	Team competition

Billie Jean Moore (May 5, 1943 – December 14, 2022) was an American college basketball coach. She was the first head coach in women's college basketball history to lead two different schools to national championships. Moore coached the California State-Fullerton Titans from 1969 to 1977, winning the Commission on Intercollegiate Athletics for Women (CIAW) national title in her first year in 1970. She led the UCLA Bruins from 1977 to 1993 and won the Association for Intercollegiate Athletics for Women (AIAW) national title in 1978. Her overall college coaching record was 436–196. Moore was the head coach of the first United States women's national basketball team to compete in the Olympics. In 1999 she was inducted into the Naismith Memorial Basketball Hall of Fame and Women's Basketball Hall of Fame.

== Early life ==
Moore was born in Humansville, Missouri, on May 5, 1943. Her family later lived in several places in neighboring Kansas before settling in Westmoreland. Her father was a principal at Westmoreland High School and coached both boys and girls basketball in the city; the school did not sponsor any sports. The family moved to Topeka, where Moore attended Highland Park High, which did not offer sports for girls. However, she played fastpitch softball as a third baseman for an industrial team sponsored by Ohse Meats Company. She also played for their Amateur Athletic Union basketball team.

== Coaching career ==
Moore started her coaching experience as an assistant at Southern Illinois University, where she pursued her master's degree. In addition to basketball, she played softball for the Raybestos Brakettes, with Lou Albrecht, who was the women's basketball coach at Cal State Fullerton. Albrecht left the school and recommended Moore, who was hired as their women's basketball coach and athletic director. In her first year as coach, her team won the CIAW national championship. She spent eight seasons at Fullerton, leading the Titans to a 140–15 record and finishing four seasons ranked in the top five.

While the United States women's national team had competed in international events such as Jones Cup, World University Games, Pan American Games and World Championships, the Olympics focuses attention like no other event. Team member Juliene Simpson explained, "Up until then, many people didn't know we had national teams playing in international competition. After the Olympics, that changed quite a bit." In 1976, the Olympics added women's basketball. Moore, who had been the assistant coach of the U.S. Pan American team which won the gold medal in Mexico in 1975, was selected to be the first Olympic head coach of the U.S. women's team. She coached the team to a silver medal in the Montreal Olympics, leading a group of college players against a Soviet Union squad with players in their mid-20s and 30s.

After her Olympic coaching experience, Moore was hired by the University of California, Los Angeles, to coach their Bruins women's team. In her first year, the team finished 27–3 and won the 1978 AIAW tournament. UCLA beat Maryland 90–74 in front of over 9,000 fans—at that time, the largest crowd ever to see a women's championship game. In two of the next three seasons, Moore led the Bruins to high national rankings. She coached at UCLA for 16 seasons, compiling a 296–181 record. However, the Bruins were 127–102 in her last eight seasons, and did not finish higher than third place in the Pacific-10 Conference during that span. She resigned after a 13–14 finish in the 1992–93 season, amid criticism in recent years of her coaching methods, as well as an ongoing review of her program after a player alleged mental and verbal abuse by Moore. "I don’t know if you can push them as hard as you could 10 years ago," Moore said. "There’s just a different level of sensitivity."

Moore ended her 24-year coaching career with a 436–196 record and a .690 winning percentage. Her teams reached the Final Four in 1970, 1972, 1975, 1978, and 1979. Moore was enshrined in the Naismith Memorial Basketball Hall of Fame in 1999 and in the Women's Basketball Hall of Fame in the same year. She received the Naismith's Women's Outstanding Contribution Award in 2002.

== National team career ==
Moore was named the assistant coach of the United States at the World University Games held in Moscow in August 1973. The event, also called the Universiade, was the eighth event to have women's basketball, but the first in which the Americans participated. The team was assigned to the same preliminary round group as the Soviet team, and drew them as their first opponent. The game was not close, as the USSR defeated Team USA 92–43. The Americans went on to defeat France and Mexico. Their 2–1 record qualified them for the medal round, but the rules of the competition carried the preliminary round results into the medal round, so they could not afford another loss. They won their next three games, all by single digit margins, against Bulgaria, Romania and Cuba. That performance qualified the US team for the gold medal game, but it matched them up against undefeated USSR. While the game was closer, the Soviets were much too strong and won 82–44 to claim the gold. The United States earned a silver medal in their first ever World University Games competition.

Moore was named to the coaching staff on Team USA as an assistant coach in 1975. Because the World Championships and the Pan American Games were scheduled only eight days apart, the United States put together a squad of players and coaches for both events. The World Championship was help in Cali, Colombia, at the end of September through early October. The US team had a disappointing result finishing 4–3 and missing the medal rounds. In the opening game, the Americans lost by two points to Japan. They bounced back to beat Australia, but then faced Czechoslovakia and lost by a single point. This relegated the team to the consolation rounds, where the team won three of four, losing only to Canada, and finishing in eighth place.

The Americans had had success in the Pan American games with gold medals in 1955,1959, and 1963, but had come in second place in both 1967 and 1971. In 1975, the team was determined to win the gold, and Moore was named assistant coach. One of the leading players on the Pan American team was Lusia Harris, whose Delta State team had beaten Immaculata in the 1975 Championship game, and would do so again in 1976. There were other notable players on the team, such as Pat Head (Summitt), Ann Meyers and others, as well as a 17-year-old high school player, Nancy Lieberman.

The games were originally planned for Chile, then Brazil when Chile withdrew the offer to host, and then Mexico City, where they were eventually held in October. The United States' first opponent was Mexico, a team that finished ahead of Team USA at the World Championships, and would end up winning the silver medal in this competition. The Americans won 99–65, setting a tone for the event. They next beat Canada 75–56. They followed that game with a convincing 116–28 victory over El Salvador. Their following game against Cuba was the only close game, with the United States winning by six points 70–64. The US team then defeated the Dominican Republic 99–50, and Colombia 74–48. This set up the final with Brazil. The team from Brazil had beaten the United States in the prior three Pan American competitions, and had won the gold medal in two of them. This time, the US team won easily 74–55, earning the gold medal for the first time in twelve years.

== Personal life and death ==
Moore died on December 14, 2022, at home in Fullerton, California, at the age of 79. She had been in hospice care with multiple myeloma.

== Publications ==
- Moore, Billie (1980). Basketball: Theory and Practice. Dubuque, Iowa: W.C. Brown Co. ISBN 9780697070890.

== General and cited references ==
- Grundy, Pamela (2005). Shattering the glass. New Press. ISBN 978-1-56584-822-1.
- Moore, Billie J (1980). Basketball: Theory and Practice. W. C. Brown Co. ISBN 978-0-697-07089-0.
- Porter, David L., ed. (2005). Basketball: A Biographical Dictionary. Greenwood Press. ISBN 978-0-313-30952-6.
- Skaine, Rosemarie (2001). Women College Basketball Coaches. Foreword by Betty F. Jaynes. Jefferson, N.C.: McFarland. ISBN 9780786409204.
