= Nicole Kaczmarski =

American basketball player

Personal information
- Born: April 30, 1981 (age 45) Long Island, New York, U.S.
- Listed height: 5 ft 11 in (1.80 m)

Career information
- High school: Longwood (Brookhaven, New York); Christ The King (Queens, New York); Sachem (Long Island, New York)
- College: UCLA (1999–2000)
- WNBA draft: 2003: 3rd round, 39th overall pick
- Drafted by: New York Liberty
- Position: Point guard
- Number: 20

Career highlights
- Gatorade National Player of the Year (1999); Miss New York Basketball (1999)
- Stats at Basketball Reference

Nicole Anne Kaczmarski (born April 30, 1981) is an American former professional basketball player. A standout player in high school, she received a Gatorade Player of the Year award, was named Miss New York Basketball and earned a spot in the 1999 USA Today All-USA high school basketball team. Heavily recruited by colleges, Kaczmarski eventually enrolled at UCLA and played one season for their women's basketball team. Kaczmarski then enrolled at the State University of New York at Stony Brook. Afterward, she had brief stints with two Women's National Basketball Association teams, the New York Liberty and the Los Angeles Sparks. In 2011, she became a color commentator for basketball telecasts. Kaczmarski's high school career and college recruitment were chronicled in the documentary film Running Down a Dream.

== High school career ==
A Long Island native, Kaczmarski first gained national recognition at Longwood High School, where she was named women's high school basketball Freshman of the Year by ESPN RISE. She led the team at Longwood to a 10-2 record and a three-way tie for the league title before falling in the quarterfinals of the Class A Playoffs against Walt Whitman High School. Kaczmarski, also known by her nickname "Kaz" subsequently had a brief stint playing for Christ The King Regional High School alongside future University of Connecticut and Women's National Basketball Association star Sue Bird. She played most of her high school basketball at Sachem High School, where she set a Long Island women's high school basketball record with 2,583 career points. Kaz played her first varsity basketball game at Sachem as an eighth grader. She led Sachem to the state title as an eighth-grader. She Helped lead Sachem to state title over Lockport in March 1995. During her high school career, she was named both Gatorade Player of the Year and Miss New York Basketball and was a selection to the 1999 USA Today All-USA high school basketball team. In the Suffolk final in 1999 as a senior, she had 45 points, 18 rebounds, seven assists and six steals in a win over previously undefeated Bellport. Highly recruited, she decided to attend UCLA. One of the last games she played as a high school player was the Women's Basketball Coaches Association All-America game. Kaczmarski's high school career and entrance into college basketball were documented in the 1999 film Running Down a Dream.

== College and professional career ==
At UCLA, Kaczmarski started at point guard early in the 1999-2000 season due to an injury to regular starter Erica Gomez. Eventually, she was shifted to the shooting guard position. Kaczmarski faced some early season struggles, but improved later in the season, ending with an average of 11.7 points per game and having set a school record by hitting seven three pointers during a game at Washington State University. Kaczmarski was also named Pac-10 Player of the Week during the final week of the regular season and was a selection to the conference all-freshman team.

Kaczmarski did not return to UCLA for her sophomore year as she had been suffering from Lyme disease, as well as plantar fasciitis due to an injury she suffered at trials for the USA Basketball World University Games team. Kaczmarski returned to school at the State University of New York at Stonybrook, but never returned to college basketball.

In 2003, Kaczmarski was drafted in the 3rd round of the 2003 WNBA draft as the final pick of her hometown Women's National Basketball Association team, the New York Liberty. She was unaware that she had been drafted until a friend called to congratulate her. Kaczmarski did not make the Liberty's regular season roster but started playing professionally in Austria and Greece. She then had a brief stint with the Los Angeles Sparks in 2005.

== Post-playing career ==
Kaczmarski pursued a career in healthcare and graduated from Stony Brook University with a degree in health science. In 2011, she returned to basketball as an analyst for the Cablevision channel MSG Varsity and for the St. John's Red Storm. The following year, Kaczmarski became the first female athlete to have her jersey retired by Sachem High School and only the fifth ever. As of October 2020, she ranks third for most career points scored in Long Island women's high school basketball.

== Honors ==
- MVP of the New York State Championships
- Gatorade National High School Player of the Year
- First Team All-America by USA Today
- Second all-time leading scorer in Long Island history
- Five-time All-State selection
- Four-time Long Island Player of the Year
- 1999 New York's Miss Basketball
- All-Pac 10 Freshman Team
- Suffolk Sports Hall of Fame
- Won two straight AAU national titles
- 2,583 points - School and Suffolk record and 2nd all-time on Long Island

== Career statistics ==
Legend
GP	Games played	GS	Games started	MPG	Minutes per game	RPG	Rebounds per game
APG	Assists per game	SPG	Steals per game	BPG	Blocks per game	PPG	Points per game
TO	Turnovers per game	FG%	Field-goal percentage	3P%	3-point field-goal percentage	FT%	Free-throw percentage
**Bold**	Career best	°	League leader

=== College career statistics ===
Year	Team	GP	GS	MPG	FG%	3P%	FT%	RPG	APG	SPG	BPG	TO	PPG
|1999-00	UCLA	29	-	-	40.7	35.6	84.1	3.7	1.9	1.5	0.0	-	11.7
**Career**		29	-	-	40.7	35.6	84.1	3.7	1.9	1.5	0.0	-	11.7
Statistics retrieved from Sports-Reference.
