= 1977–78 UCLA Bruins men's basketball team =

American college basketball season

1977–78 UCLA Bruins men's basketball

Pac-8 champions

NCAA tournament, Sweet Sixteen
- Conference: Pacific-8

Ranking
- Coaches: No. 2
- AP: No. 2
- Record: 25–3 (14–0, 1st Pac-8)
- Head coach: Gary Cunningham (1st year)
- Assistant coaches: Larry Farmer; Jim Harrick; Craig Impelman
- Home arena: Pauley Pavilion

1977–78 Pacific-8 Conference men's basketball standings
	Conf.				Overall
Team	W		L	PCT	W		L	PCT
No. 2 UCLA	14	–	0	1.000	25	–	3	.893
Oregon State	9	–	5	.643	16	–	11	.593
Washington State	7	–	7	.500	16	–	11	.593
USC	7	–	7	.500	14	–	13	.519
Oregon	6	–	8	.429	16	–	11	.593
Washington	6	–	8	.429	14	–	13	.519
California	4	–	10	.286	11	–	16	.407
Stanford	3	–	11	.214	13	–	14	.481
Rankings from AP Poll

The 1977–78 UCLA Bruins men's basketball team represented the University of California, Los Angeles in the 1977–78 NCAA Division I men's basketball season. Gary Cunningham, who would be the highest winning percentage coach of all time at UCLA, began his first of two years. The Bruins started the season ranked 6th in the nation (AP Poll). The Bruins started the season 4–0 before losing at Notre Dame. UCLA's team finished 1st in the Pac-8 regular season. They went undefeated in conference play for the first time since John Wooden's 1972–73 team in the last Pac-8 year, as the conference would add the two Arizona universities, becoming the Pac-10. UCLA participated the NCAA tournament where they lost to Arkansas.

== Starting lineup ==
Position	Player	Class
F	James Wilkes	So.
F	David Greenwood	Jr.
C	Gig Sims	So.
G	Roy Hamilton	Jr.
G	Raymond Townsend	Sr.

== Roster ==
1977–78 UCLA Bruins men's basketball team
Players
Coaches

Pos.	#	Name	Height	Weight	Year	Hometown
C	32	Darrell Allums	6 ft 9 in (2.06 m)	—	So	Los Angeles, California
G	45	Tony Anderson	6 ft 4 in (1.93 m)	—	Fr
F	34	David Greenwood	6 ft 9 in (2.06 m)	222 lb (101 kg)	Jr	Lynwood, California
G	24	Roy Hamilton	6 ft 2 in (1.88 m)	180 lb (82 kg)	Jr	Los Angeles, California
G	14	Brad Holland	6 ft 3 in (1.91 m)	217 lb (98 kg)	Jr	Billings, Montana
G	43	Rennie Kelly	6 ft 2 in (1.88 m)	—	Fr
C	31	Gig Sims	6 ft 9 in (2.06 m)	—	So
F	50	Marvin Thomas	6 ft 5 in (1.96 m)	—	Jr
G	22	Raymond Townsend (C)	6 ft 3 in (1.91 m)	175 lb (79 kg)	Sr	San Jose, California
F	55	Kiki Vandeweghe	6 ft 7 in (2.01 m)	220 lb (100 kg)	So	Wiesbaden, West Germany
F	35	James Wilkes	6 ft 7 in (2.01 m)	195 lb (88 kg)	So	Nashville, Tennessee

Head coach

Gary Cunningham (UCLA)

Assistant coach(es)

Legend

- (C) Team captain
- (S) Suspended
- (I) Ineligible
- (W) Walk-on
- Injured
- Current redshirt

Roster

== Schedule ==
Date time, TV	Rank^{#}	Opponent^{#}	Result	Record	Site city, state
Regular Season
November 26, 1977	No. 6	BYU	W 75–73	1–0	Pauley Pavilion (12,202); Los Angeles, CA
November 27, 1977	No. 6	Seattle	W 106–73	2–0	Pauley Pavilion (8,223); Los Angeles, CA
December 2, 1977	No. 6	Colorado	W 104–70	3–0	Pauley Pavilion (10,311); Los Angeles, CA
December 3, 1977	No. 6	Santa Clara	W 88–79	4–0	Pauley Pavilion (12,164); Los Angeles, CA
December 10, 1977	No. 5	No. 3 Notre Dame	L 66–69	4–1	Pauley Pavilion (12,829); Los Angeles, CA
December 16, 1977	No. 8	Southern Illinois	W 90–75	5–1	Pauley Pavilion (9,517); Los Angeles, CA
December 17, 1977	No. 8	UC Santa Barbara	W 71–55	6–1	Pauley Pavilion (9,149); Los Angeles, CA
December 22, 1977	No. 7	San Jose State	W 109–69	7–1	Pauley Pavilion (9,014); Los Angeles, CA
December 23, 1977	No. 7	New Mexico State	W 86–67	8–1	Pauley Pavilion (8,638); Los Angeles, CA
December 29, 1977	No. 8	Arizona	W 85–63	9–1	Pauley Pavilion (12,603); Los Angeles, CA
January 6, 1978	No. 7	at Washington	W 79–60	10–1 (1–0)	Hec Edmundson Pavilion (7,461); Seattle, WA
January 8, 1978	No. 7	at Washington State	W 70–55	11–1 (2–0)	Washington State University Performing Arts Coliseum (8,763); Pullman, WA
January 13, 1978	No. 7	Oregon	W 90–72	12–1 (3–0)	Pauley Pavilion (12,652); Los Angeles, CA
January 14, 1978	No. 7	Oregon State	W 77–60	13–1 (4–0)	Pauley Pavilion (12,461); Los Angeles, CA
January 22, 1978	No. 3	at No. 7 Notre Dame	L 73–75	13–2	Athletic & Convocation Center (11,345); Notre Dame, IN
January 28, 1978	No. 6	USC	W 83–71	14–2 (5–0)	Pauley Pavilion (12,712); Los Angeles, CA
February 2, 1978	No. 5	Stanford	W 101–64	15–2 (6–0)	Pauley Pavilion (12,091); Los Angeles, CA
February 4, 1978	No. 5	California	W 94–75	16–2 (7–0)	Pauley Pavilion (12,399); Los Angeles, CA
February 10, 1978	No. 5	at California	W 78–64	17–2 (8–0)	Harmon Gym (6,600); Berkeley, CA
February 11, 1978	No. 5	at Stanford	W 79–63	18–2 (9–0)	Maples Pavilion (7,982); Stanford, CA
February 17, 1978	No. 4	Washington State	W 60–59	19–2 (10–0)	Pauley Pavilion (12,438); Los Angeles, CA
February 18, 1978	No. 4	Washington	W 104–64	20–2 (11–0)	Pauley Pavilion (12,593); Los Angeles, CA
February 23, 1978	No. 3	at Oregon State	W 96–58	21–2 (12–0)	Gill Coliseum (10,522); Corvallis, OR
February 25, 1978	No. 3	at Oregon	W 83–57	22–2 (13–0)	McArthur Court (10,500); Eugene, OR
March 3, 1978	No. 2	at USC	W 91–78	23–2 (14–0)	Los Angeles Memorial Sports Arena (11,761); Los Angeles, CA
March 5, 1978	No. 2	Michigan	W 96–70	24–2	Pauley Pavilion (12,004); Los Angeles, CA
NCAA Tournament
March 11, 1978	(W 1Q) No. 2	vs. (W 3L) No. 9 Kansas; Regional Quarterfinals	W 83–76	25–2	McArthur Court (9,141); Eugene, OR
March 16, 1978	(W 1Q) No. 2	vs. (W 2L) No. 5 Arkansas; Regional semifinals	L 70–74	25–3	The Pit (17,750); Albuquerque, NM
*Non-conference game. ^{#}Rankings from AP Poll. (#) Tournament seedings in parentheses. W=West. All times are in Pacific Time.

== See also ==
- 1977-78 UCLA Bruins women's basketball team
