= Miss New York Basketball =

Basketball honor

The Miss New York Basketball honor recognizes the top high school basketball player in the state of New York. The award is presented by the Basketball Coaches Association of New York, Inc, which consists of basketball coaches at the scholastic and collegiate levels from throughout the entire state.

== Award winners ==
Year	Player	High School	College	WNBA draft
1986	Margaret McKeon	Christ the King	St. John's	
1987	Monika Kost	Lindenhurst	Duke	
1988	Tammi Reiss	Eldred	Virginia	1997 WNBA draft: 1st round, 5th pick by the Utah Starzz
1989	Norrine Powers	Nanuet	Holy Cross	
1990	Debbie Barnes	Shenendehowa		
1991	Katina Mack	Monticello	Penn State	
1992	Jennifer Scanlon	Shenendehowa	Duke	
1993	Suzanne Mayo	Valley Central	Connecticut	
1994	Sandy Mitchell	Waterloo	Seton Hall	
1995 (tie)	Chamique Holdsclaw	Christ the King	Tennessee	1999 WNBA draft: 1st Rnd, 1st overall by the Washington Mystics
1995 (tie)	Caryn Schoff	St. Johnsville Central		
1996	Missy West	Franklin Academy (Malone, NY)	Duke	
1997	Kate Smith	Roy C. Ketcham	William & Mary	
1998	Sue Bird	Christ the King	Connecticut	2002 WNBA draft: 1st Rnd, 1st overall by the Seattle Storm
1999	Nicole Kaczmarski	Sachem	UCLA	2003 WNBA draft: 3rd round, New York Liberty
2000	Carolyn Gottstein	Albany	Boston College	
2001	Bethany LeSueur	Garden City	Georgetown	
2002	Jenn Viani	Our Lady of Lourdes	Villanova	
2003	Cori Chambers	The Ursuline School	Georgia	
2004	Nicky Anosike	St. Peter's	Tennessee	2008 WNBA draft: 2nd round, 16th pick by the Minnesota Lynx
2005	Carrem Gay	Christ the King	Duke	
2006	Tina Charles	Christ the King	Connecticut	2010 WNBA draft: 1st Rnd, 1st overall by the Connecticut Sun
2007	Lorin Dixon	Christ the King	Connecticut	
2008	Shenise Johnson	Rush-Henrietta	Miami	2012 WNBA draft: 1st round, 5th pick by the San Antonio Silver Stars
2009	Ieasia Walker	Copiague	South Carolina	
2010	Bria Hartley	North Babylon	Connecticut	2014 WNBA draft: 1st round, 7th pick by the Seattle Storm
2011	Bria Smith	Christ the King	Louisville	
2012	Breanna Stewart	Cicero-North Syracuse	Connecticut	2016 WNBA draft: 1st round, 1st pick by the Seattle Storm
2013	Saniya Chong	Ossining	Connecticut	2017 WNBA draft: 3rd Round, 26th pick by the Dallas Wings
2014	Mariah Ruff	Oneonta	St. Bonaventure	
2015	Lauren "Boogie" Brozoski	Long Island Lutheran	Michigan	
2016	Dominique Toussaint	Christ the King	Virginia	
2017 (tie)	Andra Espinoza-Hunter	Ossining	Mississippi St.	
2017 (tie)	Danielle Patterson	The Mary Louis Academy	Notre Dame	
2018	Jordan Nixon	The Mary Louis Academy	Texas A&M	
2019	Aubrey Griffin	Ossining	Connecticut	2025 WNBA draft; 3rd round, 37th pick by the Minnesota Lynx
2020	Kateri Poole	South Shore High School	Ohio State	
2021	Sonia Citron	The Ursuline School	Notre Dame	2025 WNBA draft; 1st round, 3rd pick by the Washington Mystics
2022	Paris Clark	Long Island Lutheran	Arizona	
2023	Gretchen Dolan	Williamsville South	Illinois	
2024	Kate Koval	Long Island Lutheran	Notre Dame	

=== Schools with multiple winners ===
School	Number of Awards	Years
Christ the King	8	1986, 1995, 1998, 2005, 2006, 2007, 2011, 2016
Long Island Lutheran	3	2015, 2022, 2024
Ossining	3	2013, 2017, 2019
Shenendehowa	2	1990, 1992
The Mary Louis Academy	2	2017, 2018
The Ursuline School	2	2003, 2021

== See also ==
- Mr. New York Basketball
