= Teiko Nishi =

American former women's basketball player

Personal information
- Born: January 24, 1967 (age 58)
- Listed height: 5 ft 8 in (1.73 m)

Career information
- High school: North High (Torrance, California)
- College: UCLA (1984–1988)
- Position: Guard

Teiko Nishi (born January 24, 1967) is an American former women's basketball player. She played for the UCLA Bruins each year from 1985 until 1988. In 1987, Nishi, from North Torrance, California, was the only Asian American woman playing Division I basketball in southern California.

Nishi was heavily active in the Japanese American basketball leagues in Southern California throughout her childhood, and became a starter at North Torrance High School. While at North High, Nishi led her squad to CIF playoffs in her senior year, losing to Cheryl Miller's Riverside Poly in the playoffs.

While playing AAU basketball during the off-season, Nishi was heavily recruited by major universities nationwide, finally choosing UCLA over USC. In her career at UCLA, Nishi played with Jackie Joyner-Kersee, defeating the Cheryl Miller-led USC dynasty twice in their 1984-85 season.

After graduating from UCLA Nishi coached girls' basketball in South Torrance, California.

Nishi is currently coaching girls' basketball in Yorba Linda, CA.

Nishi is the older sister of Kikuo KeyKool Nishi of the rap group The Visionaries.

== Career statistics ==
=== College ===
Legend
GP	Games played	GS	Games started	MPG	Minutes per game	RPG	Rebounds per game
APG	Assists per game	SPG	Steals per game	BPG	Blocks per game	PPG	Points per game
TO	Turnovers per game	FG%	Field-goal percentage	3P%	3-point field-goal percentage	FT%	Free-throw percentage
**Bold**	Career best	°	League leader

Year	Team	GP	GS	MPG	FG%	3P%	FT%	RPG	APG	SPG	BPG	TO	PPG
1987–88	UCLA	30	-	-	37.5	0.0	56.3	1.3	4.3	1.2	0.0	-	2.6
**Career**		30	-	-	37.5	0.0	56.3	1.3	4.3	1.2	0.0	-	2.6
Statistics retrieved from Sports-Reference.
