= Bethany Koby =

American designer and inventor

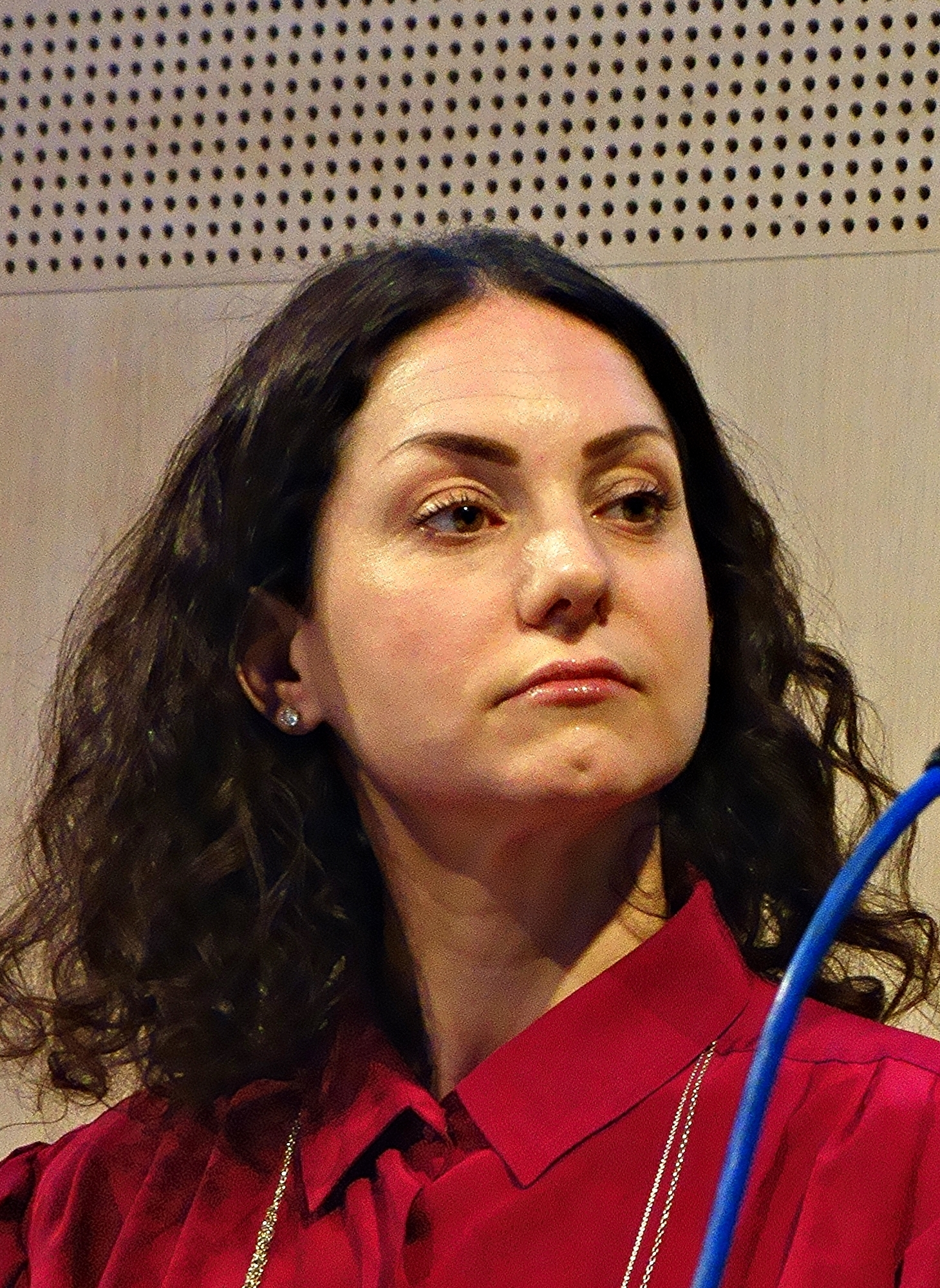
- Education: Rhode Island School of Design; Bath Spa University
- Employer(s): Tech Will Save Us; Wolff Olins
- Known for: Innovation and making
- Website: www.techwillsaveus.com (archive)

Bethany Koby is an American designer and inventor. She was the co-founder and chief executive officer of the insolvent business Tech Will Save Us.

== Education and early career ==
Koby is from Los Angeles. Her mother taught in a Montessori school and her father was a photographer. She attributes this to her love of making. She studied graphic design at the Rhode Island School of Design in 2000. She earned a Master of Science in responsibility and business from Bath Spa University, which she studied in an effort to inform her art work. She was a scholar at the Fabrica research centre. Koby joined the consultancy Wolff Olins, where she worked as design director and social impact specialist for 9 years. She became interested in more interactive and effective ways to teach young people technology.

== Career ==
Koby co-founded Tech Will Save Us when she found a discarded laptop in Hackney in 2012. Investors in their first seed-funding round included Gi Fernando, Christopher Mairs (chairman of Code Club) and Saatchi & Saatchi. She worked with Nesta, Google and Mozilla to investigate what young people enjoyed and how it mapped to skills.

Tech Will Save Us created DIY gadgets for everyday life that inspire creative imagination in young people. They sold 8,000 units in their first year. She raised a $1.8 million investment from venture capital funding, and sought the advice of Matt Webb and Tracy Doree. They have sold kits in over 100 countries and several major retailers, including in John Lewis, Barnes & Noble and Myer. Their kits have been acquired by the Museum of Modern Art and Design Museum. In 2009 she collaborated with the Dalston Mill to present an art show for the Barbican Centre. She has taught classes at Kaospilot. In 2015 Koby partnered with the BBC to ensure one million eleven-year-old children had access to a Micro Bit. She designed the Tech Will Save Us Mover Kit, which raised £50,000 from a two-day crowdfunding campaign. The Mover Kit is a toy wearable for children that they can code themselves. In 2016 they won Best Hardware at the Europas and in 2017 they were awarded the Best Kids Tech Kit from the Consumer Technology Association. In 2018 they raised $4.2 million in Series A funding. They collaborated with The Walt Disney Company on a Marvel Avengers themed kit that encourages children to invent superheroes to complete secret missions.

Koby recognises that parental buy-in is essential to reach children and young people. She has written for Goop and presented at the Family Tech Summit. An interview with her appears in the Coursera course on Brand Management. Koby was selected as one of the top entrepreneurs in the UK tech sector by Growth Business in 2017. She was championed by Innovate UK as one of their Game Changers. She is one of the Creative Review Creative Leaders 50. She is on the advisory board of The Education Foundation. She was voted Innovator of the Year in the Tech Playmaker Awards in 2018. She delivered the Design School Pioneers Lecture at the University of the Arts London in January 2018, and has been part of various Maker Faires.

In 2019, Koby was 22nd in Computer Weekly's 50 'Most Influential Women in UK Tech' shortlist for her role as CEO and co-founder of Technology Will Save Us.

Tech Will Save Us became insolvent in April 2021, despite raising £1.3 million the previous year from crowdfunding and the British government's Future Fund. The assets of the business were acquired for £99,000 in a pre-pack administration by a company controlled by Koby and her associates.
