= Calliope mini =

Single-board computer developed for educational usage

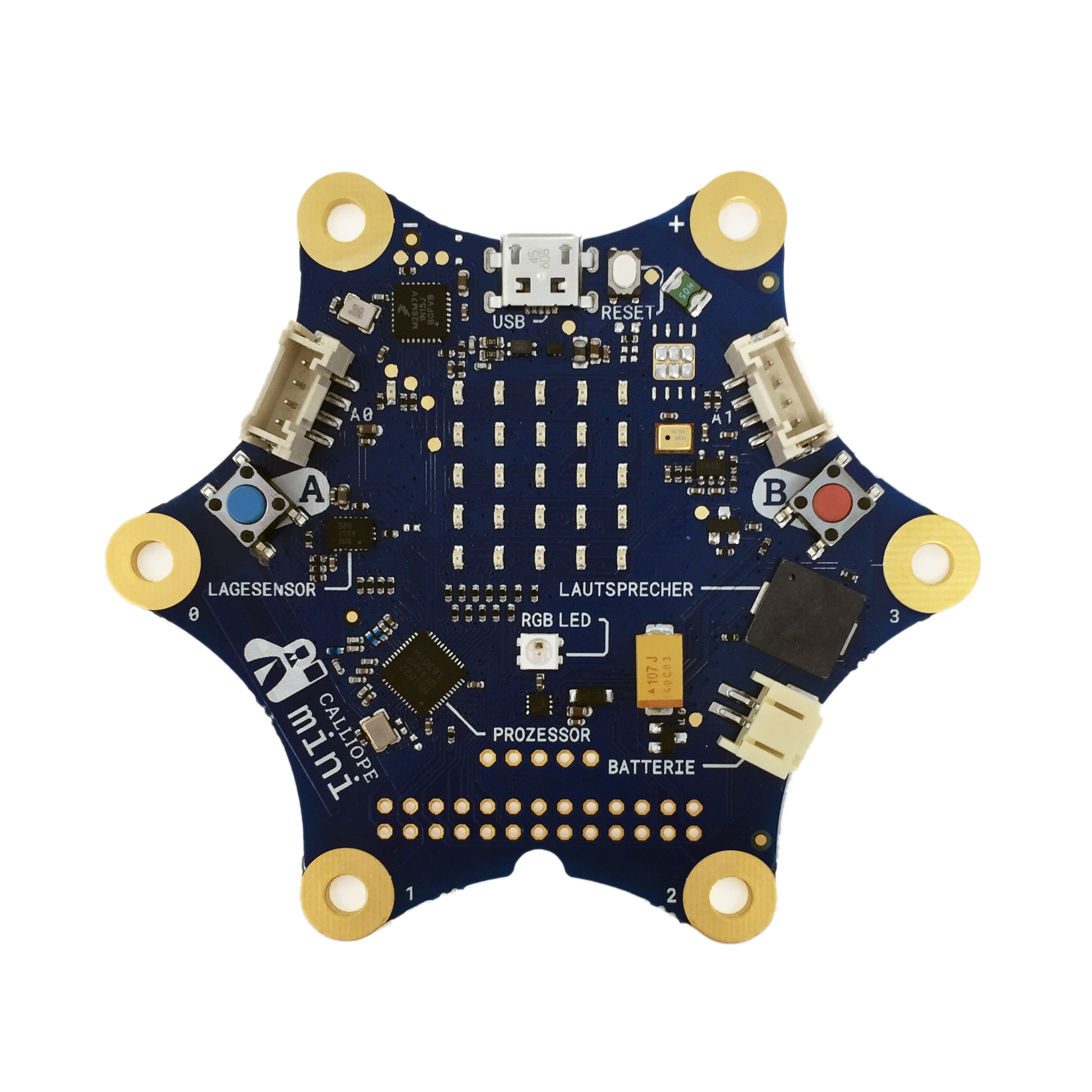
Calliope mini

The Calliope mini is a single-board computer developed for educational usage at German primary schools. The goal of the initiative is to provide all pupils as of grade three of primary schools in Germany with a Calliope mini free of charge.

== Background ==
Calliope mini was inspired by the BBC micro:bit, which was distributed to pupils of grade seven in the United Kingdom. The non-profit Calliope gGmbH is responsible for developing and maintaining the Calliope mini.

The name "Calliope mini" is a reference to Kalliope, a daughter of Zeus and the muse who presides over eloquence, science and epic poetry.

== Hardware ==
- Nordic nRF51822 multi-protocol Bluetooth Low Energy / 2.4 GHz RF SoC
  - 32-bit ARM Cortex-M0 processor (16 MHz)
  - 16 KB RAM
  - 256 KB Flash
  - Bluetooth Low Energy
- 5×5 LED matrix display
- Accelerometer, gyroscope, magnetometer (Bosch BMX055)
- MEMS microphone
- DC motor driver (TI DRV8837)
- Piezo speaker
- RGB LED (WS2812B)
- 2 programmable buttons
- Serial interface (USB + configurable ports)
- PWM output
- 4 banana plug / crocodile clip connections
- 4 analog inputs
- 8–11 input/output connections (depending on software configuration)
- SPI + I²C
- USB Micro B connection (programming and power supply)
- JST battery connector (3.3 V)
- Banana / crocodile clip connection for 3.3 V (output)
- 2 Grove connectors (I²C + serial / analog)
- NXP KL26z (USB and power supply)
- Flash program memory (optional)

== See also ==
- BBC micro:bit
- Raspberry Pi
- Arduino
- Open Roberta
