= Technology Will Save Us =

UK technology company

- Type: Privately held company
- Founded: 2012
- Founder: Daniel Hirschmann; Bethany Koby
- Headquarters: London, United Kingdom
- Products: Mover Kit; Gamer Kit; Electro Dough Kit; Synth Kit; Thirsty Plant Kit; Speaker Kit; Start Arduino Kit
- Number of employees: 20
- Website: techwillsaveus.com

Technology Will Save Us was a UK company that made DIY gadget kits. The company entered administration on 17 March 2021. They collaborated with the BBC on the Micro Bit.

The company was founded in 2012 in London by Bethany Koby and Daniel Hirschmann. Koby stated that the idea to start the company came after Koby and Hirschmann found a discarded laptop and were inspired to look at the modern consumer's relationship with technology.
