= Bethany Stahl =

American author and illustrator

- Born: Bethany Stahl
- Citizenship: United States
- Occupations: Writer, illustrator, fine artist
- Years active: 2019–present
- Notable work: Save the Ocean, Save the Earth® series
- Awards: Literary Distinction Award for Save the Ocean (2019)

Bethany Stahl is an American author and illustrator of primarily nature-themed children's picture books. She has also written non-fiction literature and creates fine art, with a majority of work created en plein air. She was awarded for her literary distinction for Save the Ocean at the 1st National Author's Day: Celebrate Our Authors event in Knoxville, Tennessee in 2019. She has had her stories transformed into public art installations across the United States. Her most notable book, Save the Ocean, was recommended by the Ocean Conservancy and State Director Drew Bell with Environment America in 2020.

== Career ==
Stahl's Save the Earth® series tackles climate change as well as a variety of environmental concerns affecting flora and fauna reflected in her artwork. Her work is used to celebrate the environment in schools and create climate awareness around the world, where educational facilities use her work to teach children with hands-on activities. Stahl has donated artworks to benefit green spaces such as the University of Tennessee's Botanical Gardens, has volunteered her time to environmental work, and created a Roots and Shoots program that landed her group a certificate of appreciation from Dr. Jane Goodall. Stahl's fine art work echoes the message of environmental preservation. Stahl's advocacy for endometriosis has led doctors to recommend her work and question sexism in medicine.

== Bibliography ==
- Save the Ocean (2019)
- Endometriosis: it's not in your head, it's in your pelvis (2019)
- Save the Arctic (2019)
- Save the Bees (2020)
- Mermaids, Mermaids in the Sea (2020)
- Save the Land (2020)
- Save the Scraps (2020)
- Save the Sharks (2021)
- Save the Butterflies (2021)
- Save the Sky (2022)
- Save the Air (2022)
- Save the Reef (2022)

A workbook based on the Save the Earth series was published in 2020.

== Adaptations ==
- Save the Ocean was adapted into a StoryWalk in 2020 where the Coalition for Children and the Falmouth Public Library in Falmouth, Massachusetts took the book apart, page by page, to create an interactive walking trail with jellyfish puppets, and educational stops along the way.
- Save the Ocean was adapted into a StoryWalk in 2021. The Murrysville Community Library in Pennsylvania removed the pages from its binding and installed individual spreads to create an interactive story through the Murrysville Wetlands Trail maintained by the Murrysville Trail Alliance with educational activities along the trail.
- Save the Butterflies was adapted into an Explore to Read trail in 2022 where the Botanical Garden of the Piedmont in Charlottesville, Virginia installed large-scale pages for visitors to read along the nature trail.
- Save the Ocean was utilized nationally in the United States for the Oceans of Possibilities Summer Reading Program of 2022 supported by the Institute of Museum and Library Services.
- Save the Air was adapted into a StoryWalk in 2024 at Rankin Lake in Gastonia, North Carolina by the City of Gastonia. The book's pages were removed from its binding and installed individual spreads.
- Save the Bees was adapted into a StoryWalk in April 2024 at Rankin Lake in Gastonia, North Carolina. The book's pages were removed from its binding and installed individual spreads.
- Save the Butterflies was adapted into a StoryWalk in June 2024 at Rankin Lake in Gastonia, North Carolina. The book's pages were removed from its binding and installed individual spreads.
- Save the Bees was transformed into a StoryWalk in June 2024 in the River Falls Community Garden as an outdoor read-a-long celebration.
