= Bethany LeSueur =

American basketball player and coach (born 1983)

Personal information
- Born: January 6, 1983 (age 43)
- Listed height: 5 ft 11 in (1.80 m)

Career information
- High school: Garden City High School
- College: Georgetown University
- Position: Guard
- Number: 24

Bethany LeSueur (born January 6, 1983) is a former Long Island high school basketball player. A six-year starter at guard, for Garden City High School. LeSueur compiled a record of 121–12, a .910 winning percentage. LeSueur led her team to three state final fours, three Long Island Championship's, three Nassau County Championships, and six Conference Championships. LeSueur holds the Long Island scoring record (male or female) with 3,167 points.

LeSueur scored 30 points or more in 38 games during her high school career. She received the Gatorade Player of the Year award for New York in 2000 and 2001, as well as Miss New York Basketball (2001). She was a Street & Smith All-American, a USA Today All-American, and also started in the Nike-WBCA All-America Game.

LeSueur was a three-sport athlete at Garden City where she also competed for the lacrosse and soccer teams. She was named First Team All-State in soccer and was All-County twice. Off the court, LeSueur was a member of the National Honor Society and a Merit Scholar. Garden City High School retired LeSueur's number, making her the first and only athlete in the school's history to receive this honor.

== College ==
LeSueur was a three-year starter at Georgetown University as well as a two-year team captain. In her three years with the Hoyas, she is one of only seven players in Georgetown history to record over 800 points, 200 assists and 400 rebounds. She also received honors such as Defensive Player of the Year for the Hoyas and the Patricia E. Corace Hustle Award. Additionally, LeSueur was the team MVP for Georgetown for the 2005–2006 season. LeSueur was in the top ten in steals in the Big East her junior and senior seasons. She ranked in the top 3 in more than 5 statistical categories for the Hoyas.

=== Virginia and Georgetown statistics ===
Legend
GP	Games played	GS	Games started	MPG	Minutes per game
FG%	Field goal percentage	3P%	3-point field goal percentage	FT%	Free throw percentage
RPG	Rebounds per game	APG	Assists per game	SPG	Steals per game
BPG	Blocks per game	PPG	Points per game	**Bold**	Career high

Year	Team	GP	Points	FG%	3P%	FT%	RPG	APG	SPG	BPG	PPG
2001–02	Virginia	22	63	27.9%	18.2%	**73.5%**	1.6	0.7	0.4	0.0	2.9
2002–03	Georgetown	Sat out the season due to NCAA transfer rules									
2003–04	Georgetown	**28**	232	**38.3%**	11.1%	55.3%	5.5	2.8	2.0	**0.1**	8.3
2004–05	Georgetown	**28**	275	37.4%	**33.3%**	57.4%	**5.6**	2.5	**2.0**	**0.1**	9.8
2005–06	Georgetown	27	**321**	36.2%	16.7%	64.1%	4.9	**3.6**	1.7	0.1	**11.9**
Career		105	891	36.5%	11.1%	60.5%	12.7	2.5	1.6	0.1	8.5

== Post-playing career ==
LeSueur currently resides in Garden City with her husband, Tom Hughes. She is a business education teacher at East Meadow High School as well as the Girls Varsity Basketball Coach. LeSueur also serves as the Director of Female Programs for the Rising Stars Organization and the head female trainer for Pro Hoops, Inc.
