= 1978 AIAW National Large College Basketball Championship =

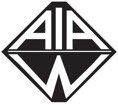

Tournament information
- Dates: March 17, 1978–March 25, 1978
- Administrator: Association for Intercollegiate Athletics for Women
- Host: University of California, Los Angeles
- Venue: Los Angeles, California
- Participants: 16

Final positions
- Champions: UCLA (1st title)
- Runner-up: Maryland

Tournament statistics
- Matches played: 20

The 1978 AIAW National Large College Basketball Championship was held on March 17–25, 1978. Sixteen teams were invited, and the UCLA Bruins led by Ann Meyers were crowned national champions. In the national championship game, the Bruins defeated the Maryland Terrapins 90–74, in front of a record crowd of 9,351 at Pauley Pavilion.

This was the first AIAW Tournament to divide the first two rounds into four regional sites, and also the first to be held over the course of two weekends. Th previous tournament in 1977 was held as a sixteen-team single-site event over in one week in Minneapolis. The host site for the Final Four was UCLA in Los Angeles. The championship game was televised nationally for the first time, by NBC. The 1978 national championship represented a shift from the smaller schools to larger schools with larger athletic budgets such as UCLA and Maryland It was pivotal in terms of hosting, organization, format, television rights, and attendance. The NCAA Division I women's basketball tournament, which was first played at the end of the 1981-82 women's basketball season, would prevail as the season-completing tournament for women's college basketball. Ann Meyers being the first woman to receive a four-year athletic scholarship is regarded as one of the defining moments in the history of women's sports.

== Opening rounds ==
=== East Regional – New Brunswick, NJ ===
First Round; March 18, 1978
Montclair State	74
Utah	50
Queens College	74
Mississippi	71

Quarterfinals; March 19, 1978
Montclair State	75
Queens College	60
Consolation
Utah	45
Mississippi	66

=== West Regional – Long Beach, CA ===
First Round; March 17, 1978
UCLA	102
Brigham Young	57
Stephen F. Austin	96
Washington	55

Quarterfinals; March 18, 1978
UCLA	86
Stephen F. Austin	60
Consolation
Brigham Young	68
Washington	58

=== South Regional – Cleveland, MS ===
First Round; March 17, 1978
Maryland	75
Tennessee	69
Valdosta State	75
S. Connecticut St.	82

Quarterfinals; March 18, 1978
Maryland	93
S. Connecticut St.	53
Consolation
Tennessee	80
Valdosta State	83

=== Central Regional – Denton, TX ===
First Round; March 17, 1978
Wayland Baptist	66
Ohio State	56
North Carolina State	70
Missouri	64

Quarterfinals; March 18, 1978
Wayland Baptist	72
North Carolina State	55
Consolation
Ohio State	69
Missouri	79

=== Final Four – Los Angeles, CA ===
Semifinals; March 23, 1978
Montclair State	77
UCLA	85
Maryland	90
Wayland Baptist	85

Final; March 25, 1978
UCLA	90
Maryland	74
Third place
Montclair State	90†
Wayland Baptist	88

† Overtime

== See also ==
- 1978 AIAW National Small College Basketball Championship
