= Special input/output =

Specialised microcontroller functionality

Special input/output (Special I/O or SIO) are inputs and/or outputs of a microcontroller designated to perform specialized functions or have specialized features.

Specialized functions can include:

- Hardware interrupts,
- analog input or output
- PWM output
- Serial communication, such as UART, USART, SPI bus, or SerDes.
- External reset
- Switch debounce
- Input pull-up (or -down) resistors
- open collector output
- Pulse counting
- Timing pulses

Some kinds of special I/O functions can sometimes be emulated with general-purpose input/output and bit banging software.

== See also ==
- Atari SIO
