= Function (engineering) =

In engineering, a function is interpreted as a specific process, action or task that a system is able to perform.

== In engineering design ==
In the lifecycle of engineering projects, there are usually distinguished subsequently: Requirements and Functional specification documents. The Requirements usually specifies the most important attributes of the requested system. In the Design specification documents, physical or software processes and systems are frequently the requested functions

== In products ==
For advertising and marketing of technical products, the number of functions they can perform is often counted and used for promotion. For example a calculator capable of the basic mathematical operations of addition, subtraction, multiplication, and division, would be called a "four-function" model; when other operations are added, for example for scientific, financial, or statistical calculations, advertisers speak of "57 scientific functions", etc. A wristwatch with stopwatch and timer facilities would similarly claim a specified number of functions. To maximise the claim, trivial operations which do not significantly enhance the functionality of a product may be counted.

== See also ==
- Process
- System
- Utility
