= Bit specification =

In computing, bit specification may mean:

- Computer hardware or software capabilities or design features expressed in terms of bit counts. Higher bit specification (e.g. 16-bit vs. 8-bit) usually indicates better performance. Examples:
  - Color depth
  - Computer bus size
  - Processor register size
  - Sound quality
- Specification or datasheet where the meaning of individual bits in a larger, for example byte-length, message is described. Bit specifications are often required to document low-level device control or data transmission protocols. See bit manipulation
- When using uppercase, BIT Specification may refer to the requirements of a Built in Test for a machine.

== See also ==
- Functional specification
