= Bit twiddler =

In computing, bit twiddler may refer to:

- A piece of source code that does bit twiddling, which may mean:
  - Doing bit manipulation;
  - Interacting with computer hardware, especially when using a bit-banging technique;
  - Reading or writing binary file formats; or
  - Being unnecessarily complex, perhaps due to premature optimization
- A programmer who writes bit twiddlers, as described above
- A hacker, an enthusiast or a programmer with profound understanding of the fundamentals of computer operation
- A hex editor, a software application that allows the manipulation of binary computer files
