= BiSS interface =

Open source interface

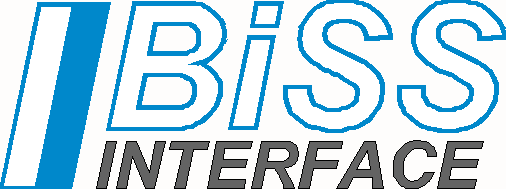
Logo

The open source BiSS interface (bidirectional/serial/synchronous) is based on a protocol which implements a real time interface. It enables a secure serial digital communication between controller, sensor and actuator. The BiSS protocol is designed in B mode and C mode (continuously bidirectional mode). It is used in industrial applications which require transfer rates, safety, flexibility and a minimized implementation effort. The BiSS interface has roots in SSI and a simplified INTERBUS. The proprietary standards, Hiperface and EnDat are competing solutions.

== Application ==
- Position sensor system
  - Rotary encoder (absolute encoder)
  - Linear position sensors (absolute encoder)
- Drive control (motor feedback)
- Intelligent sensor system (smart sensors)
- Robotics

== BiSS features ==
- Open source
- Hardware compatible for SSI standard (synchronous serial interface)
- Cyclic reading of sensor data up to 64 bit per slave
- Transmission of status data, parameter, measured temperature value, configuration description, etc.
- Isochronal, real time capable data transmission
- Bidirectional communication with two unidirectional lines
- Point-to-point or multi-slave networks
- Maximum user data rate, transmission data depending on driver and line of e.g. RS-422: 10 MHz, 1 km; LVDS: 100 Mbit/s
- Independent of the applied physical layer
- CRC secured communication (sensor data and control data secured separately)

== Characteristics of BiSS C ==
- Continuous sensor data transmission without interruption while using control data
- Activation of actuators in bus during sensor data transmission
- Broader standardization through BiSS profiles, BiSS EDS (electronic data sheet), BiSS USER DATA, etc.
- Full compatibility of BiSS identifier (already defined in BiSS B)

== History of BiSS in position sensor system ==
- BiSS was showcased in 2002 by its founders iC-Haus GmbH
- Since BiSS B is not motor feedback compatible, BiSS C has been preferred in the market
- All patent cases against BiSS B were dropped in 2012:
  - EP 0790489B1: "Mode switching by frequency comparison"
  - DE 19701310B4: "Mode switching as such"
  - EP 1168120B1: "Block transmission of additional uncritical data"
- Multi-cycle data (MCD) are no longer utilized in the position sensor system with BiSS
- Because BiSS utilizes the PHY of SSI [(RS-422)], it develops as the successor of the SSI interface in automation
