= Chip select =

Control line in digital electronics

An example SPI with a master and three slave select lines. Note that all four chips share the SCLK, MISO, and MOSI lines but each slave has its own slave select.

In digital electronics, chip select (CS), also known as slave select (SS) or chip enable (CE), is the name of a control line used to select one (or a set) of integrated circuits (commonly called "chips") out of several connected to the same computer bus, usually utilizing three-state logic. The chip select is a command pin on many integrated circuits which connects the I/O pins on the device to the internal circuitry of that device. When the chip select pin is held in the inactive state, the chip or device is "deaf", and pays no heed to changes in the state of its other input pins; it holds its outputs in the high impedance state, so other chips can drive those signals. When the chip select pin is held in the active state, the chip or device assumes that any input changes it "hears" are meant for it, and responds as if it is the only chip on the bus. Because the other chips have their chip select pins in the inactive state, their outputs are high impedance, allowing the single selected chip to drive its outputs.

One bus that uses the chip/slave select is the Serial Peripheral Interface Bus (SPI bus).

CS may also affect power consumption or serve as cycle control in certain circuits (such as SRAM or DRAM).
