= OLinuXino =

Single-board computer

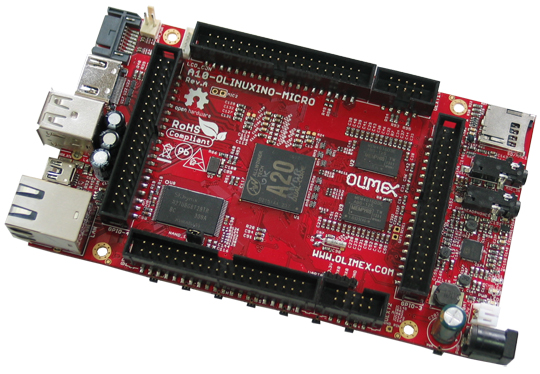
A10-OLINUXINO-MICRO Open Source Hardware Linux computer

OLinuXino is an open hardware single-board computer capable of running Android or Linux designed by OLIMEX Ltd in Bulgaria.

The project's goal was to design DIY friendly industrial-grade Linux board which everyone can reproduce at home. It leverages widely available hand-solderable components which are reasonable to purchase in low quantities, housed in TQFP packages. The project's CAD files are hosted on GitHub, allowing everyone to study and customize them according to their needs.

Initially OLinuXino was designed with EAGLE. In March 2016 the first boards designed with KiCad became available as OLIMEX Ltd announced plans on switching development to Open Source CAD tools.

== iMX233 ==
iMX233-OLinuXino Development Timeline
Start of development	7 March 2012
PCB routing complete	23 March 2012
First 10 prototypes available	17 April 2012

iMX233-OLinuXino Variants
iMX233-OLinuXino-	NANO	MICRO	MINI	MINI-WIFI	MAXI
Processor	i.MX233 ARM926J @ 454 Mhz	i.MX233 ARM926J @ 454 Mhz	i.MX233 ARM926J @ 454 MHz	i.MX233 ARM926J @ 454 MHz	i.MX233 ARM926J @ 454 MHz
RAM	64 MB	64 MB	64 MB	64 MB	64 MB
Storage	MicroSD-card connector	SD-card connector	SD-card connector	SD-card connector	SD-card connector
Video Output	None	TV PAL/NTSC	TV PAL/NTSC	TV PAL/NTSC	TV PAL/NTSC
Audio Input	None	None	Stereo	Stereo	Stereo
Audio Output	None	None	Stereo Headphones	Stereo Headphones	Stereo Headphones
USB High Speed Hosts	1	1	3	3	2
Ethernet	None	None	None	None	100 Mbit/s
Wireless Module	None	None	None	RTL8188CU	None
Buttons	3	3	2	2	2
UEXT	Yes	?	Yes	Yes	Yes
GPIO pins	2x24	2x30	40	40	40
Power Input	?	?	6-16 VDC	6-16 VDC	6-16 VDC
Dimensions (PCB)	3.00 in × 0.8 in (76 mm × 20 mm)	3.00 in × 1.70 in (76 mm × 43 mm)	3.70 in × 2.15 in (94 mm × 55 mm)	3.70 in × 2.15 in (94 mm × 55 mm)	3.70 in × 2.15 in (94 mm × 55 mm)
Dimensions (Nominal)	3.40 in × 0.8 in (86 mm × 20 mm)	3.40 in × 1.70 in (86 mm × 43 mm)	3.70 in × 2.65 in (94 mm × 67 mm)	3.70 in × 2.65 in (94 mm × 67 mm)	3.70 in × 2.65 in (94 mm × 67 mm)
Notes	U_DEBUG pin headers; 3.7 V Li-Po battery connector and built-in battery charger; Breadboard compatible; JTAG pads for bare-board programming; Weight: 0.5 ounces (14 grams)		Board is shaped to fit inside Pactec JM42 plastic box	Board is shaped to fit inside Pactec JM42 plastic box	Board is shaped to fit inside Pactec JM42 plastic box

== A13 ==
The Chinese company Allwinner released in April 2012 Cortex-A8 SoC in TQFP package, this was spotted immediately by OLinuXino developers and they start working on OLinuXino board based on A13 Three OLinuXino boards with A13 processor were released:

A13-OLinuXino Variants
A13-	OLinuXino-MICRO	OLinuXino	OLinuXino-WIFI
CPU	Allwinner A13 SoC with Cortex-A8 @ 1 GHz	Allwinner A13 SoC with Cortex-A8 @ 1 GHz	Allwinner A13 SoC with Cortex-A8 @ 1 GHz
GPU	Mali-400	Mali-400	Mali-400
RAM	256 MiB (128 Mbit x 16)	512 MiB (2 x 256 Mbit x 8)	512 MiB (2 x 256 Mbit x 8)
Storage	SD-card connector for booting Linux image	SD-card connector for booting optional Linux images	SD-card connector for booting optional Linux images 4 GB NAND flash Android OS ready-to-use in the NAND memory
Video Output	VGA LCD signals available on connector so LCD can still be used if VGA/HDMI is disabled	VGA LCD signals available on connector so LCD can still be used if VGA/HDMI is disabled	VGA LCD signals available on connector so LCD can still be used if VGA/HDMI is disabled
Audio Input	Microphone input pads (no connector)	Microphone	Microphone
Audio Output	Yes	Yes	Yes
USB High Speed Hosts	1 USB host 1 USB OTG which can power the board	3 + 1 USB hosts: 3 available for users; 1 leads to onboard pinout; 1 USB OTG which can power the board	3 + 1 USB hosts: 3 available for users; 1 for WIFI RTL8188CU 802.11n 150 Mbit module; 1 USB OTG which can power the board
Ethernet	No	No	No
Wireless Module	No	No	RTL8188CU 802.11n 150 Mbit
Buttons	1	5 for Android navigation	5 for Android navigation
UEXT	Yes	Yes	Yes
GPIO pins	68/74 pins and these signals: 17 for adding NAND flash; 22 for connecting LCDs; 20+4 including 8 GPIOs which can be input, output, interrupt sources; 3x I2C; 2x UARTs; SDIO2 for connecting SDcards and modules; 5 system pins: +5 V, +3.3 V, GND, RESET, NMI	68/74 pins and these signals: 17 for adding NAND flash; 22 for connecting LCDs; 20+4 including 8 GPIOs which can be input, output, interrupt sources; 3x I2C; 2x UARTs; SDIO2 for connecting SD cards and modules; 5 system pins: +5 V, +3.3 V, GND, RESET, NMI	68/74 pins and these signals: 17 for adding another NAND flash; 22 for connecting LCDs; 20+4 including 8 GPIOs which can be input, output, interrupt sources; 3x I2C; 2x UARTs; SDIO2 for connecting SD cards and modules; 5 system pins: +5 V, +3.3 V, GND, RESET, NMI
RTC	No	PCF8536	PCF8536
Power input	5 VDCin, noise-reduction	6-16 VDCin, noise-reduction Battery option and connector	6-16 VDCin, noise-reduction Battery option and connector
Dimensions (PCB)	100 mm × 85 mm (3.9 in × 3.3 in)	120 mm × 120 mm (4.7 in × 4.7 in)	120 mm × 120 mm (4.7 in × 4.7 in)
Mount holes	4	4	4
Notes			

== A10S ==
In November 2012, Allwinner released a new A10S processor with HDMI and Ethernet and dual-core A20 processor. The A13 has no native Ethernet capability, so the A10S processor was chosen for new OLinuXino boards.

A10S-OLinuXino Variants
Board Name	A10S-OLinuXino-MICRO / A10S-OLinuXino-MICRO-4 GB
CPU	A10S Cortex-A8 processor @ 1 GHz
GPU	Mali-400, NEON
RAM	512 MB
Storage	MicroSD; SD/MMC; MICRO-4 GB version has 4 GB NAND Flash memory
Video Output	HDMI with ESD protectors; LCD connector compatible with Olimex 4.3-, 7.0-, 10.1-inch LCD modules; Composite TV-output on connector (not populated)
Audio Input	Microphone input on connector (not populated)
Audio Output	Yes
USB High Speed Hosts	USB High-speed host with power control and current limiter; USB-OTG with power control and current limiter
Ethernet	100 Mbit/s
Wireless	No
UEXT	Yes
GPIO	50 GPIOs on 3 GPIO connectors
Power Input	5Vin, noise-reduction
Dimensions (PCB)	4.0 in × 3.2 in (102 mm × 81 mm)
Mount Holes	4
Notes	DEBUG-UART connector for console debug with USB-SERIAL-CABLE-F; STATUS LED; Power LED; 2 KB EEPROM for MAC address and other storage; 5 BUTTONS with ANDROID functionality + BOOT/REC and POWER buttons; JTAG-DEBUG connector (not populated); UART1 connector (not populated)

== A20 ==
A20-OLinuXino Variants
A20-OLinuXino-	MICRO	MICRO-4 GB	LIME	LIME-4 GB	LIME2	LIME2-n4GB	LIME2-n8GB	LIME2-e4GB
CPU	Allwinner A20 dual-core ARM Cortex-A7 @ 1 GHz							
GPU	Dual-core Mali 400 GPU							
RAM	1 GB DDR3		512 MB DDR3		1 GB DDR3			
Storage:SATA	SATA connector with 5 V SATA power jack							
Storage:MicroSD	Yes	Yes	Yes	Yes	Yes	Yes	Yes	Yes
Storage:SD/MMC	Yes	Yes	?	?	?	?	?	?
Storage:NAND Flash	No	4 GB	No	4 GB	No	4 GB	8 GB	No
Storage:eMMc	No	No	No	No	No	No	No	4 GB
Video Output	1080p@?Hz; HDMI output with ESD protectors; VGA via 6-pin 1.25 mm (0.049 in) step connector; LCD connector compatible with Olimex 4.3-, 7.0-, 10.1-inch LCD modules		1080p@?Hz; LCD connector compatible with 4.3-, 7.0-, 10.1-inch LCD modules from Olimex					
Audio Input	Yes	Yes	?	?	?	?	?	?
Audio Output	Yes	Yes	?	?	?	?	?	?
USB High Speed Hosts	2 x USB High-speed host with power control and current limiter; USB-OTG with power control and current limiter							
Ethernet	100 Mbit/s	100 Mbit/s	100 Mbit/s	100 Mbit/s	1 Gbit/s	1 Gbit/s	1 Gbit/s	1 Gbit/s
Wireless	No	No	No	No	No	No	No	No
UEXT	2	2	?	?	?	?	?	?
GPIO	160 GPIOs on three GPIO connectors		160 GPIOs on four GPIO connectors					
Power Input	6-16 VDCin, noise-reduction; LiPo Battery connector, charging		5 VDCin, noise-reduction; LiPo Battery connector, charging					
Dimensions (PCB)	5.6 in × 3.250 in (142.2 mm × 82.6 mm)		84 mm × 60 mm					
Mount Holes	4							
Notes	A20 is not industrial grade (−25 to +85 °C) but 0 to +70 °C; DEBUG-UART connector for console debug with USB-SERIAL-CABLE-F; GPIO LED; Battery charge status LED; Power LED; 2 KB EEPROM for MAC address storage and more; 10 buttons with Android functionality + RESET button		DEBUG-UART connector for console debug with USB-SERIAL-CABLE-F; GPIO LED; Battery charge status LED; Power LED; 2 KB EEPROM for MAC address storage and more; 3 buttons with Android functionality + RESET button					

== A64 ==
A64-OLinuXino Variants
A64-OlinuXino-	1G0G	1G4GW	2G16G-IND
CPU	Allwinner A64 - 1.2 GHz Quad-Core ARM Cortex-A53 64-bit	Allwinner A64 - 1.2 GHz Quad-Core ARM Cortex-A53 64-bit	Allwinner A64 - 1.2 GHz Quad-Core ARM Cortex-A53 64-bit
GPU	Mali400 MP2	Mali400 MP2	Mali400 MP2
RAM	1GB DDR3L @ 672Mhz	1GB DDR3L @ 672Mhz	2GB DDR3L @ 672Mhz
Storage	MicroSD card connector for cards up to 32GB	MicroSD card connector for cards up to 32 GB; 4 GB eMMc memory	MicroSD card connector for cards up to 32 GB; 16 GB eMMc memory
Video Output	HDMI; LCD output on 40-pin ribbon cable connector; MIPI DSI with 20-pin ribbon connector	HDMI; LCD output on 40-pin ribbon cable connector; MIPI DSI with 20-pin ribbon connector	HDMI; LCD output on 40-pin ribbon cable connector; MIPI DSI with 20-pin ribbon connector
Audio Input	Microphone input (phone jack; can be changed to Line-in and Line-out via jumpers)	Microphone input (phone jack; can be changed to Line-in and Line-out via jumpers)	Microphone input (phone jack; can be changed to Line-in and Line-out via jumpers)
Audio Output	Headphone output (phone jack; can be changed to Line-in and Line-out via jumpers)	Headphone output (phone jack; can be changed to Line-in and Line-out via jumpers)	Headphone output (phone jack; can be changed to Line-in and Line-out via jumpers)
USB	USB-OTG support on microUSB connector; USB host on USB type A connector; USB HSIC signals available on 4-pin header drills at 0.1" step	USB-OTG support on microUSB connector; USB host on USB type A connector; USB HSIC signals available on 4-pin header drills at 0.1" step	USB-OTG support on microUSB connector; USB host on USB type A connector; USB HSIC signals available on 4-pin header drills at 0.1" step
Ethernet	Gigabit Ethernet	Gigabit Ethernet	Gigabit Ethernet
Wireless Module	No	Yes	No
Bluetooth	No	Yes	No
LED	1x Power indication; 1x Battery charging status; 1x User-programmable	1x Power indication; 1x Battery charging status; 1x User-programmable	1x Power indication; 1x Battery charging status; 1x User-programmable
Buttons	3; UBOOT, RESET, POWER	3; UBOOT, RESET, POWER	3; UBOOT, RESET, POWER
UART	Serial debug header with 0.1" pins	Serial debug header with 0.1" pins	Serial debug header with 0.1" pins
UEXT	10-pin header drills at 0.1" step for UEXT expansion	10-pin header drills at 0.1" step for UEXT expansion	10-pin header drills at 0.1" step for UEXT expansion
GPIO	40-pin header drills at 0.1" step with useful signals (like CSI camera interface and GPIOs)	40-pin header drills at 0.1" step with useful signals (like CSI camera interface and GPIOs)	40-pin header drills at 0.1" step with useful signals (like CSI camera interface and GPIOs)
SPI	Optional SPI Flash on SO8 connector	Optional SPI Flash on SO8 connector	Optional SPI Flash on SO8 connector
RTC	RTC battery expansion: pad provided for powering the RTC of AXP803	RTC battery expansion: pad provided for powering the RTC of AXP803	RTC battery expansion: pad provided for powering the RTC of AXP803
Power Input	DC 5 V (2.1/5.5 mm barrel plug, center positive ); 3.7 Li-Po battery with charger and connector	DC 5 V (2.1/5.5 mm barrel plug, center positive ); 3.7 Li-Po battery with charger and connector	DC 5 V (2.1/5.5 mm barrel plug, center positive ); 3.7 Li-Po battery with charger and connector
Dimensions (PCB)	(90.0 x 62.5)mm ~= (3.5 x 2.5)"	(90.0 x 62.5)mm ~= (3.5 x 2.5)"	(90.0 x 62.5)mm ~= (3.5 x 2.5)"
Mount Holes	4	4	4
Notes			Industrial grade components (capable of operating between -40 and +85°C)

== Operating systems ==
Officially supported:

- Debian
- Android

Third party:

- Armbian
- Arch Linux ARM

== See also ==
- List of open-source hardware projects
