= Battery indicator =

Indicator displaying the state of a battery

A battery indicator (also known as a battery gauge) is a device or software which gives information about a battery. This will usually be a visual indication of the battery's state of charge. It is particularly important in the case of a battery electric vehicle.

== Automobiles ==
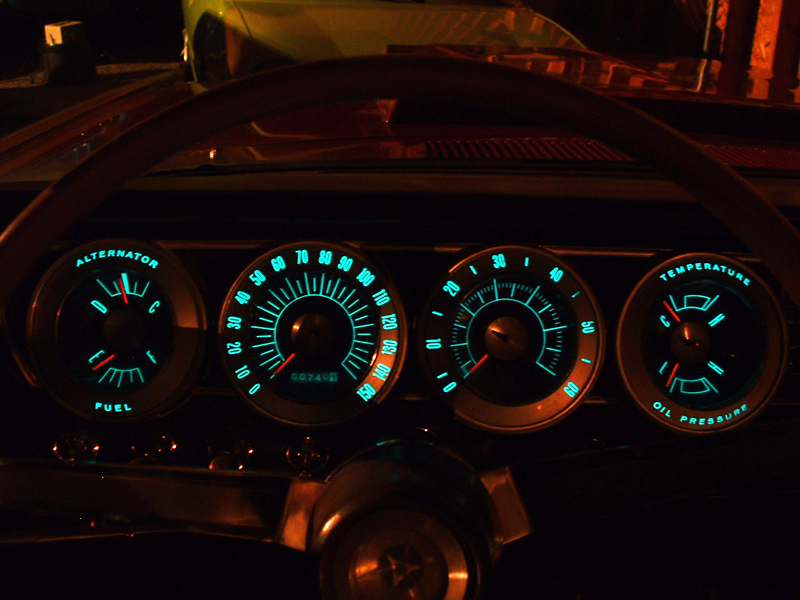
1966 Dodge Charger dashboard, note ammeter marked "Alternator" at top left

Some automobiles are fitted with a battery condition meter to monitor the starter battery. This meter is essentially a voltmeter, but it may also be marked with coloured zones for easy visualization.

Many newer cars no longer offer voltmeters or ammeters; instead, these vehicles typically have a light with the outline of an automotive battery on it. This can be somewhat misleading as it may be confused for an indicator of a bad battery when in reality it indicates a problem with the vehicle's charging system.

Alternatively, an ammeter may be fitted. This indicates whether the battery is being charged or discharged. In the adjacent picture, the ammeter is marked "Alternator" and the symbols are "C" (charge) and "D" (discharge).

Both ammeters and voltmeters individually or together can be used to assess the operating state of an automobile battery and charging system.

== Electronic devices ==
A battery indicator is a feature of many electronic devices. In mobile phones, the battery indicator usually takes the form of a bar graph - the more bars that are showing, the better the battery's state of charge. Battery level can also be displayed through a percentage where a higher percent indicates a higher battery level.

== Computers ==
Computers may give a signal to users that an internal standby battery needs replacement. Portable computers using rechargeable batteries generally give the user some indication of the remaining operating time left on the battery. A Smart Battery System uses a controller integrated with an interchangeable battery pack to provide a more accurate indication of the state of battery charge.

== Batteries not part of a system ==
Batteries that are part of a system, such as computer batteries, can have their properties checked and logged in operation to assist in determining remaining charge. A real battery can be modeled as an ideal battery with a specified electromotive force (EMF), in series with an internal resistance. As a battery discharges, the EMF may drop or the internal resistance increase; in many cases the EMF remains more or less constant during most of the discharge, with the voltage drop across the internal resistance determining the voltage supplied. Determining the charge remaining in many battery types not connected to a system that monitors battery use is not reliably possible with a voltmeter. In battery types where EMF remains approximately constant during discharge, but resistance increases, voltage across battery terminals is not a good indicator of capacity. A meter such as an equivalent series resistance meter (ESR meter) normally used for measuring the ESR of electrolytic capacitors can be used to evaluate internal resistance. ESR meters fitted with protective diodes cannot be used because a battery will simply destroy the diodes and damage itself. An ESR meter known not to have diode protection will give a reading of internal resistance for a rechargeable or non-rechargeable battery of any size down to the smallest button cells which gives an indication of the state of charge. To use it, measurements on fully charged and fully discharged batteries of the same type can be used to determine resistances associated with those states.

The cost of an ESR meter makes it uneconomic for measuring battery voltages as its only function, but a meter used for checking capacitors can take on the additional duty.

== See also ==
- Battery Management System
- Smart Battery Data
- State Of Health
- State of charge
- Smart battery
