= Power key =

Computer key

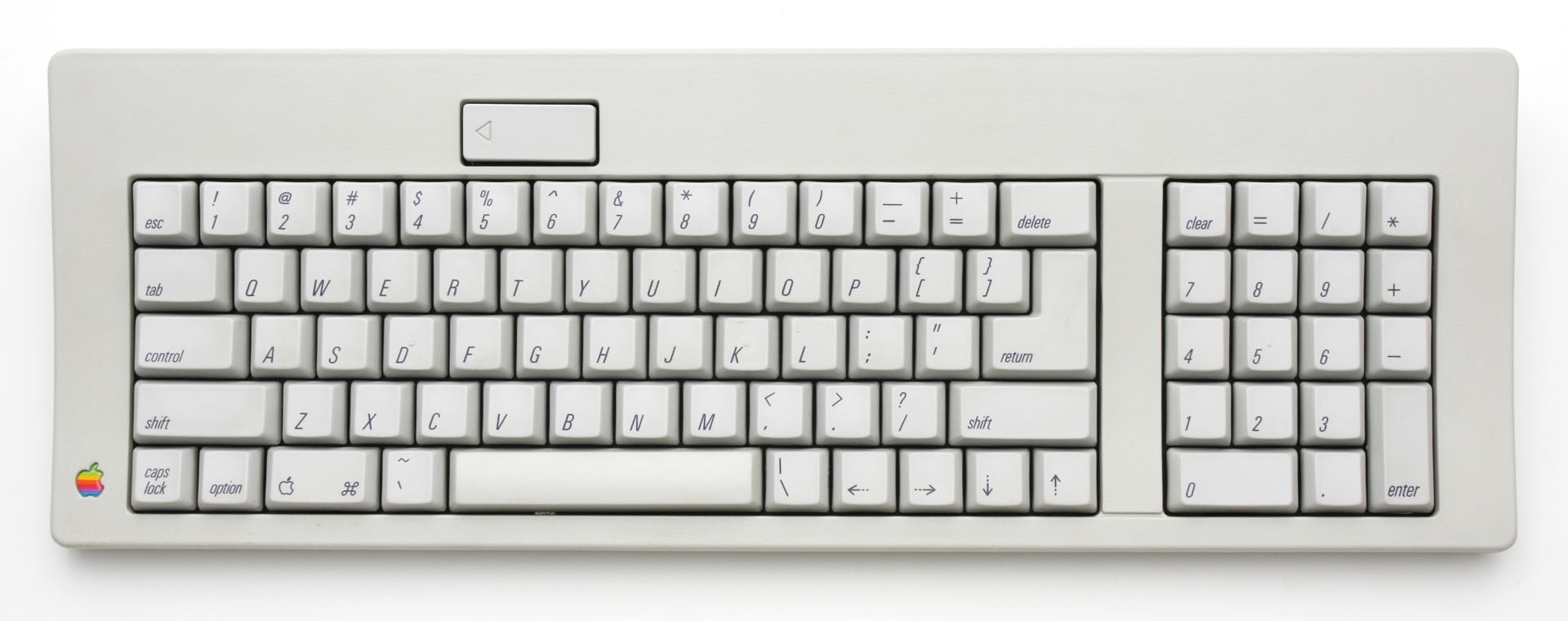
The Apple Keyboard featured a prominent power key above the standard keyboard keys. The triangle icon was used to represent power on in these earlier models.

The power key, or power button, is a key found on many computer keyboards during the 1980s and into the early 2000s. They were introduced on the first Apple Desktop Bus keyboards in the 1980s and have been a standard feature of many Macintosh keyboards since then. They are also found on an increasing number of Microsoft Windows keyboards, sometimes supplanted with additional keys for sleep.

== Mac ==
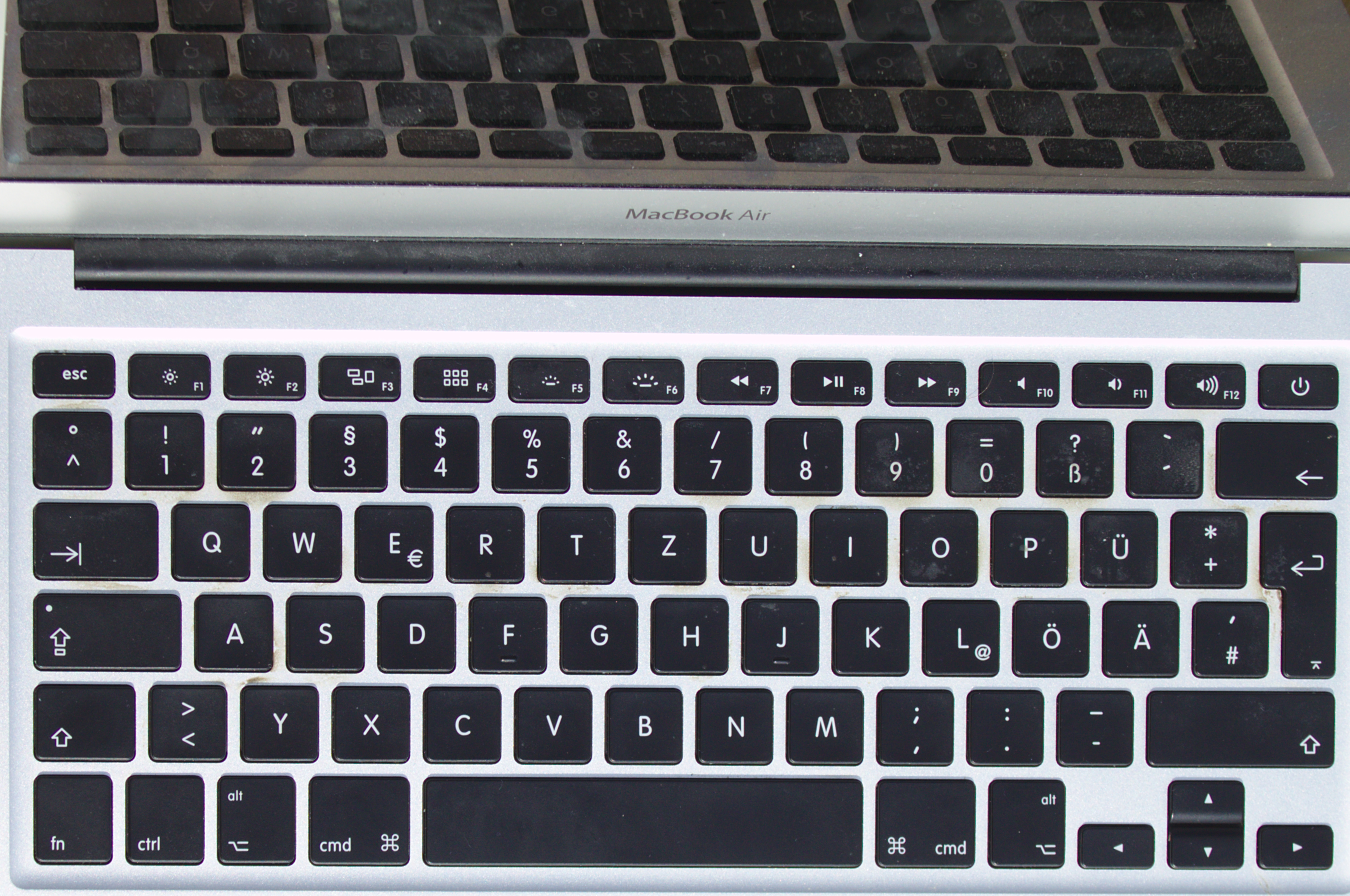
The modern MacBook Air includes a power key with the "1 in a circle" icon.

The Apple Desktop Bus (ADB) was introduced on the Apple IIGS in 1986. This peripheral bus was intended to connect low-speed input devices like keyboards and computer mice. Looking for a low-cost connector, the design team selected the 4-pin mini-DIN connector, which is also used for S-Video. ADB only used one data pin and +5V and ground, leaving one pin free. This was used to implement the PSW connection, used to turn on the machine. A separate connection was required as the keyboard controller of machines of this era was not powered when the machine was powered down.

Introduced along with the IIGS was the Apple Keyboard, which featured a rather large power key roughly centered above the main part of the keyboard. A power key became a standard feature of all ADB keyboards, notably the lauded Apple Extended Keyboard and its follow-ons. It began to become less common on later USB-based keyboards as these machines keep the keyboard powered when the machine is sleeping, so any key can act as a power key. Power keys remain on some modern Macs, including the MacBook Air, but most others have replaced it with an "eject" key, formerly used to open the now-non-existent CD drive.

== Windows ==
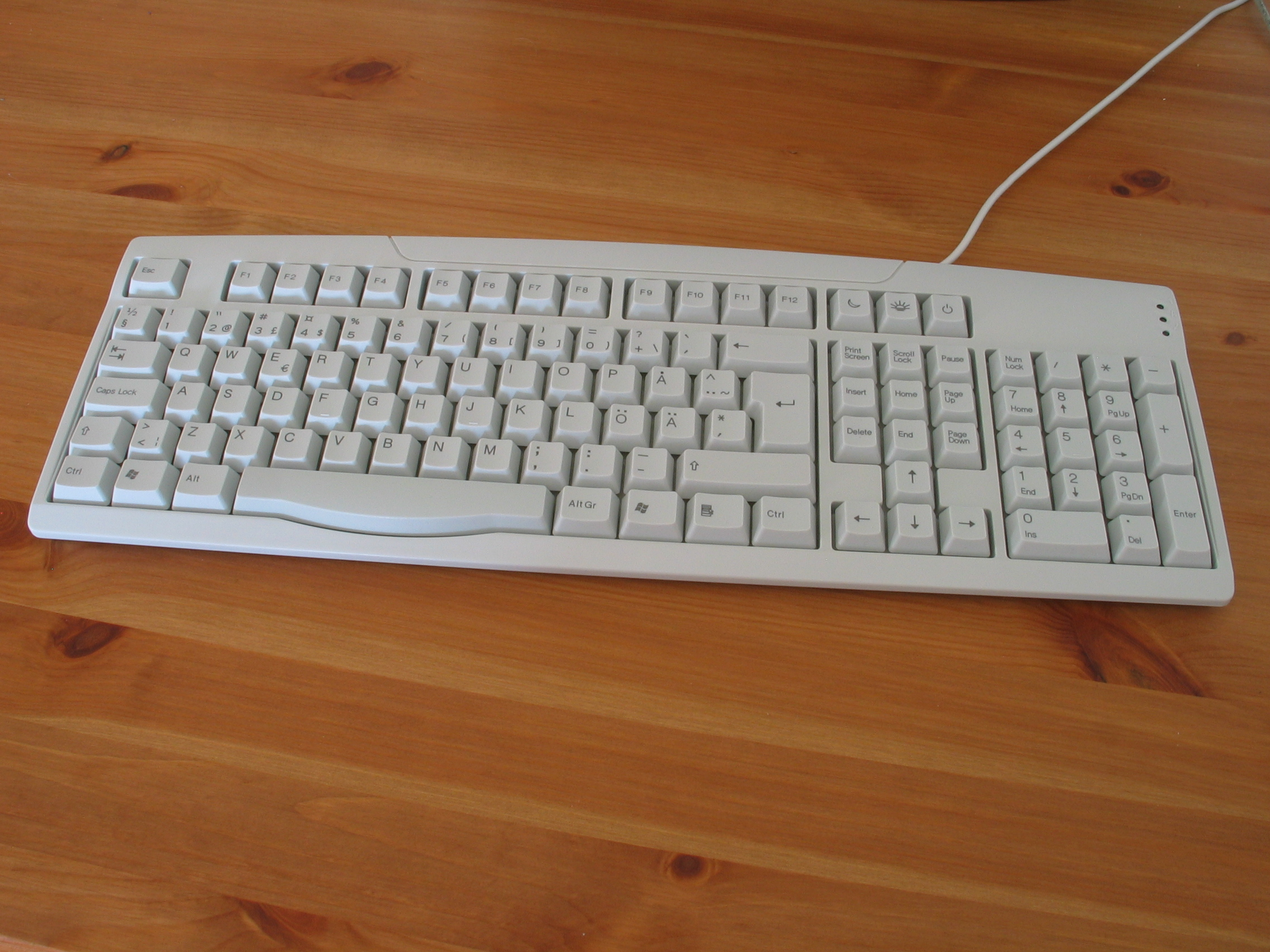
This multifunction keyboard has separate keys for sleep, wake and power on/off.

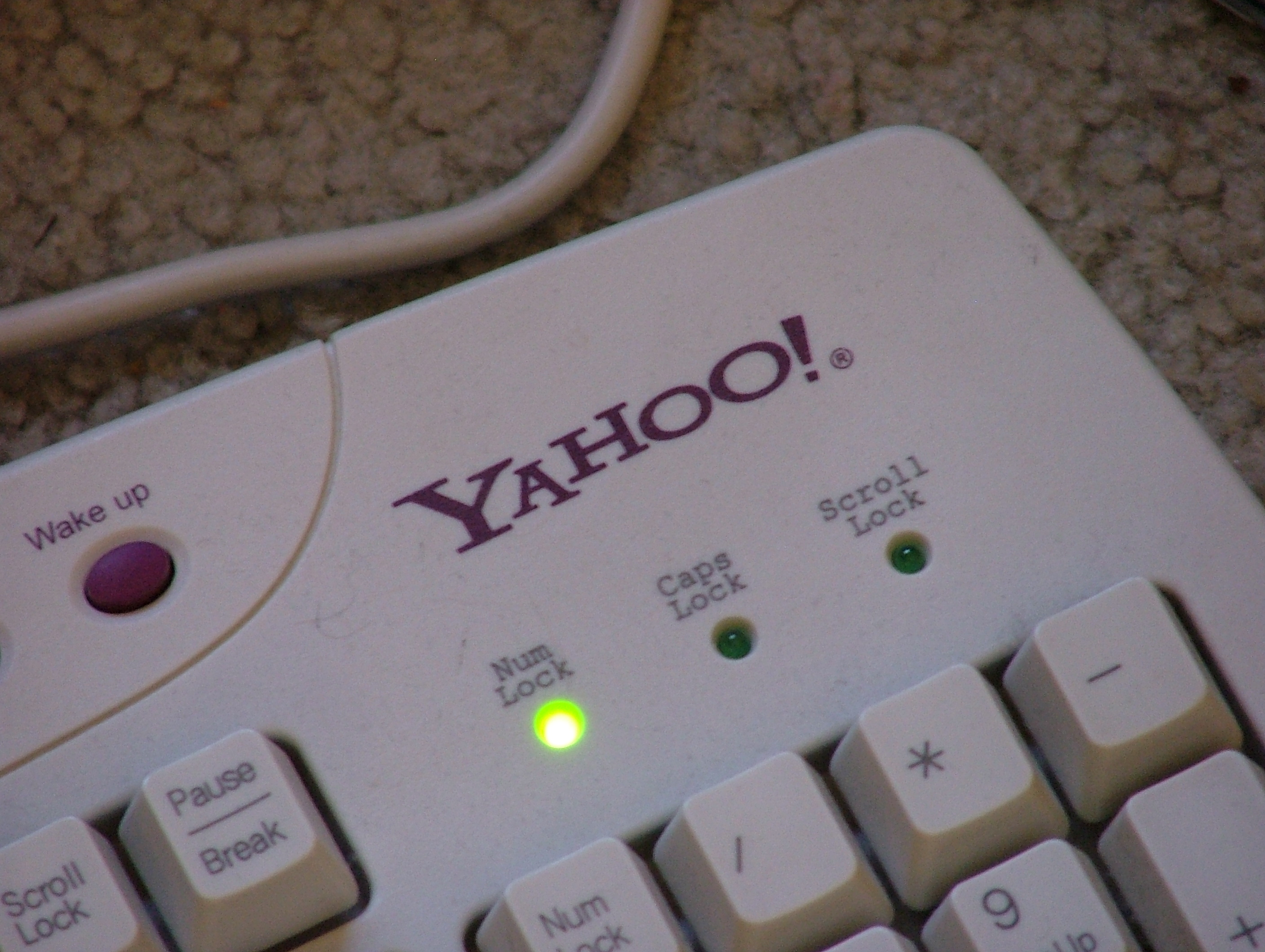
On PC keyboards, power keys were often based on rubber mechanisms, like this Yahoo-branded example.

Early Windows PCs generally lacked the ability to control power through software, and power keys were not physically possible. The increasing use of USB connections allowed these. Power keys did become relatively common on some multimedia keyboards, where they were known as power management keys.

Special keycodes are associated with these functions, e05e for Power, e05f for Sleep, and e063 Wake. These are supported in Microsoft Windows and various Unix-like systems.

On many notebook and desktop PCs sold today, the power button on front of the box can also be configured as a power on/power off button or a sleep/wake button, in addition to buttons that may be present separately on keyboards. Notebooks also include an invisible button in the screen lid, so that closing the screen on the keyboard will activate the sleep function. In Windows, this can be configured to enter one of the "sleeping modes", i.e. "suspend to RAM" (with fast wake up by pressing any key) or "suspend to disk" (i.e. hibernation, where waking up will require pressing the power button, restoring all running applications in their current running state), or to shut down the PC completely (closing all running applications and services, pressing the power button will reboot the PC, possibly in "fast boot" mode if enabled in BIOS/EFI settings and Windows settings).

Pressing any of these keyboard or case buttons, or using the desktop Start menu to simply "shut down" the PC will not apply pending system updates immediately (as it could be lengthy and could use too much energy if the battery power level is too low), but will delay them until the next "restart" menu option is selected, or an administrative update for Windows instructs the PC (with a sufficient battery level or connected to an AC power source) to restart to apply updates during the shutdown, and normal restart (with fast boot temporarily disabled to terminate all system updates preinstalled during the shutdown phase).
