= Automotive pixel link =

Automotive Pixel Link, or APIX, is a high-speed serial multichannel link designed to interconnect displays, cameras, and control units over a single cable, primarily for automotive applications. It supports gigabit data rates and enables efficient transmission of video and other data. The second generation, APIX2, can transmit up to two independent high-resolution real-time video channels simultaneously. It also supports bidirectional protected data communication with protocols such as Ethernet, SPI, and I2C, and includes 8 audio channels.

APIX was developed by INOVA Semiconductors, headquartered in Munich, Germany. INOVA supplies its own chips and licenses the intellectual property to other semiconductor manufacturers, including Fujitsu, Toshiba, Analog Devices, Cypress, and Socionext.

== Popularity ==
The standard is used by a growing number of car OEMs especially in the infotainment area.

It was licensed in 2008 by Fujitsu for use in their automotive controllers. There are also Commercial off-the-shelf boards available from e.g. Congatec. There are also implementations as IP block for Xilinx FPGAs.

== Specifications ==
APIX (or APIX1) logo

APIX (or APIX1), which is on lifetime buy through the end of 2019, allows for:

- Two- or Four-Wire Full Duplex Link
- Up to 1 Gbit/s Downstream Link
- Up to 62.5 Mbit/s max Upstream Link
- Low EMI
- Wide spread-spectrum pixel clock
- More than 15 m distance with low profile STP cables
- 10/12/18/24 bit pixel Interface

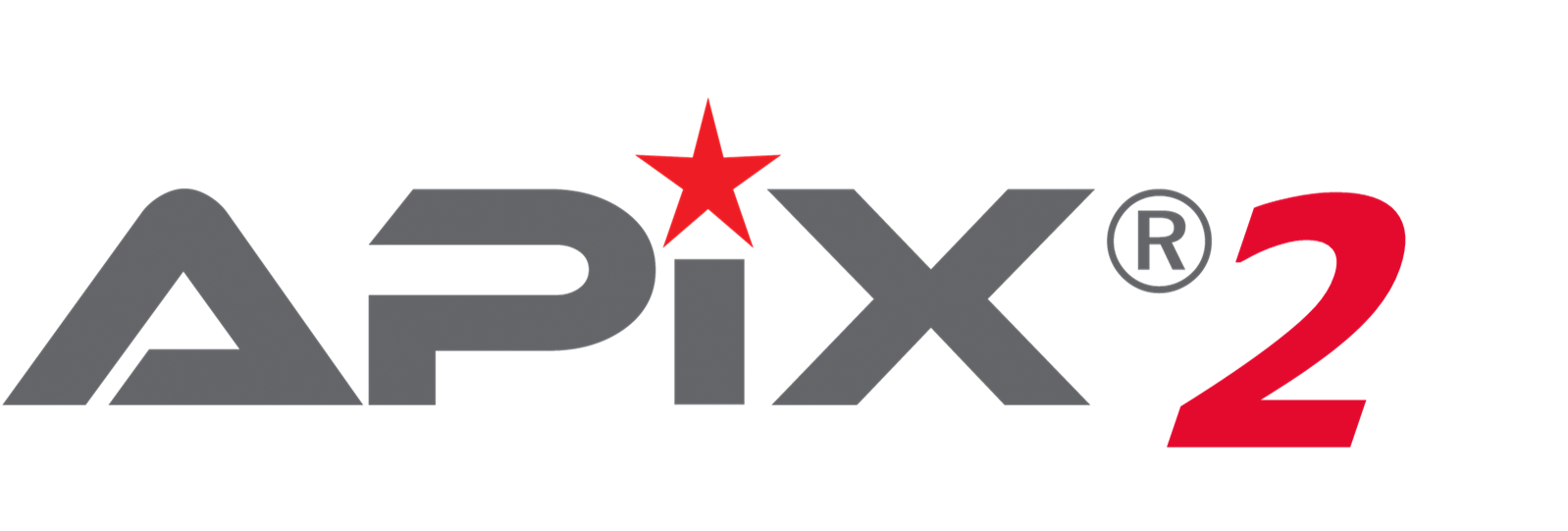
APIX2 logo

APIX2 allows for higher link speeds and more flexibility:

- It can mix various data streams, including SPI, I2C or Ethernet
- 500 Mbit/s, 1 Gbit/s and 3 Gbit/s sustained downstream link bandwidth
- 187.5 Mbit/s upstream link bandwidth
- Single/dual channel LVDS 18 or 24 bit
- Video resolution up to 1280x720x24bit (720p) / 2 x 1280x720x18 bit / 1600x600x24 bit @ 60 Hz

APIX3 logo

APIX3 adds higher link speeds:

- Support STP (shielded twisted pair), QTP (quad twisted pair) and co-axial
- Link bandwidth of 6 Gbit/s over STP and 12 Gbit/s over QTP
- Video resolution up to HD and Ultra HD
