= Smart battery =

Rechargeable battery pack

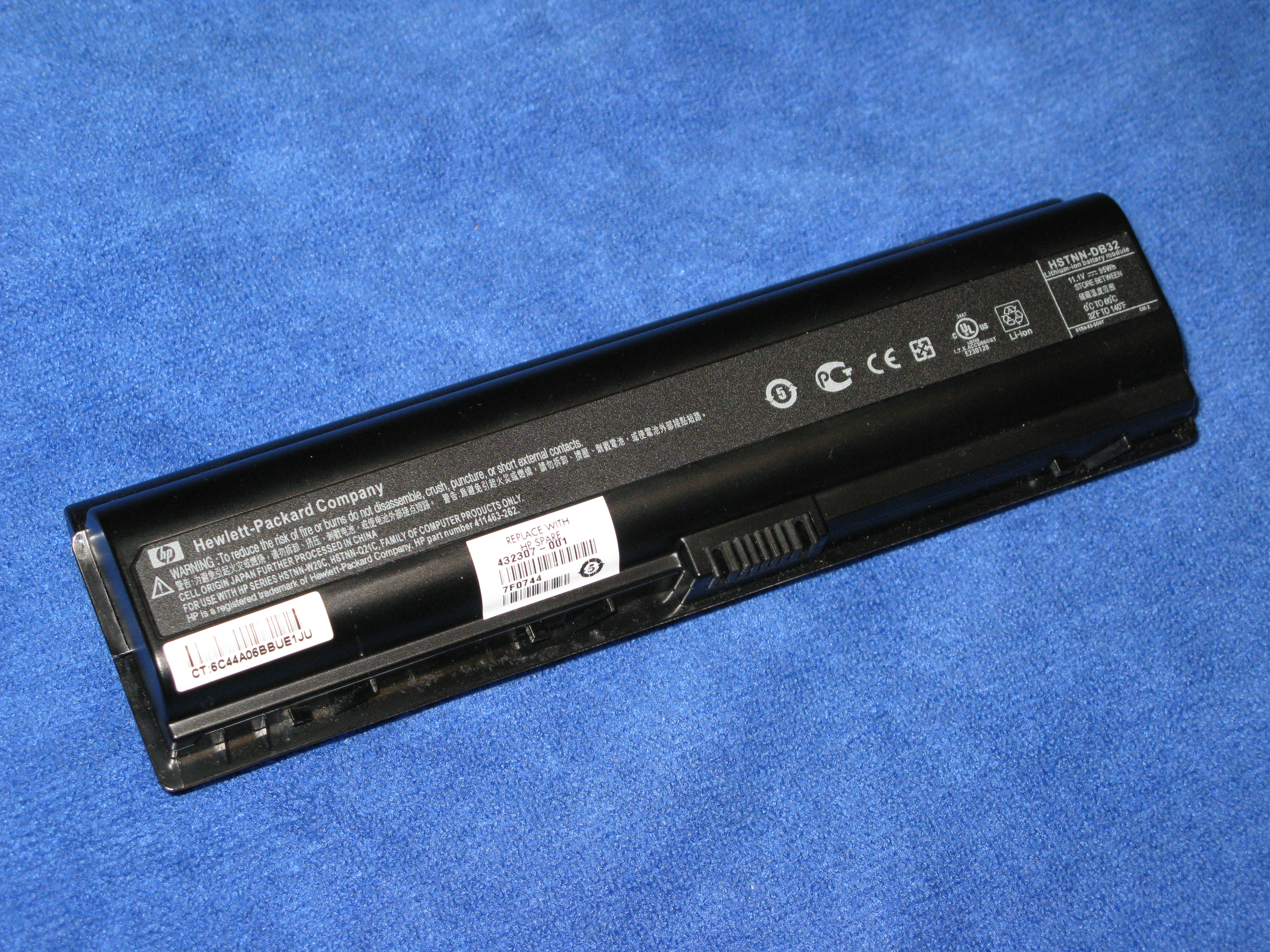
Almost all laptops use smart batteries.

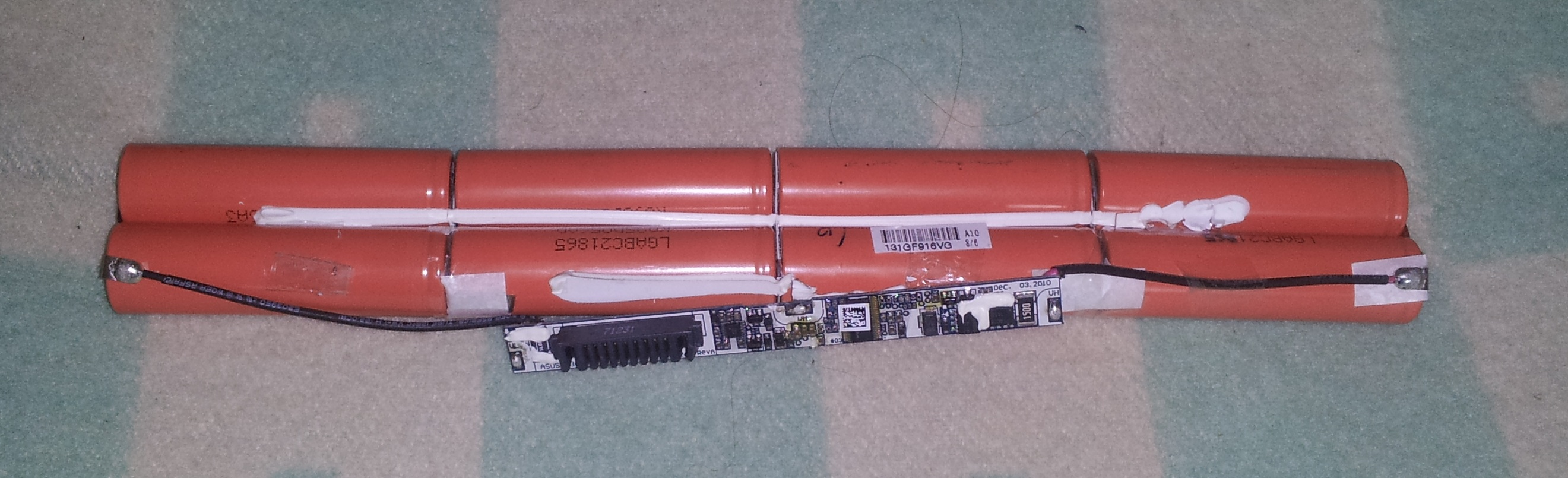
Smart battery components

A smart battery or a smart battery pack is a rechargeable battery pack with a built-in battery management system (BMS), usually designed for use in a portable computer such as a laptop. In addition to the usual positive and negative terminals, a smart battery has two or more terminals to connect to the BMS; typically the negative terminal is also used as BMS "ground". BMS interface examples are: SMBus, PMBus, EIA-232, EIA-485, and Local Interconnect Network.

Internally, a smart battery can measure voltage and current, and deduce charge level and SoH (State of Health) parameters, indicating the state of the cells. Externally, a smart battery can communicate with a smart battery charger and a "smart energy user" via the bus interface. A smart battery can demand that the charging stop, request charging, or demand that the smart energy user stop using power from this battery. There are standard specifications for smart batteries: Smart Battery System, MIPI BIF and many ad-hoc specifications.

== Charging ==
A smart battery charger is mainly a switch mode power supply (also known as high frequency charger) that has the ability to communicate with a smart battery pack's battery management system (BMS) in order to control and monitor the charging process. This communication may be by a standard bus such as CAN bus in automobiles or System Management Bus (SMBus) in computers. The charge process is controlled by the BMS and not by the charger, thus increasing security in the system. Not all chargers have this type of communication, which is commonly used for lithium batteries.

Besides the usual plus (positive) and minus (negative) terminals, a smart battery charger also has multiple terminals to connect to the smart battery pack's BMS. The Smart Battery System standard is commonly used to define this connection, which includes the data bus and the communications protocol between the charger and battery. There are other ad-hoc specifications also used.

=== Hardware ===
Smart battery controller integrated circuits are available. Linear Technology manufactures, such as the LTC4100, or the LTC4101, are Smart Battery System-compatible products.

Microchip Technology provides an application note for a smart battery charger based on the PIC16C73. The PIC16C73 source code is available for this application.

== See also ==
- Battery charger
- CMOS battery
- Rechargeable battery
