= Apple Extended Keyboard =

Keyboard by Apple Inc.

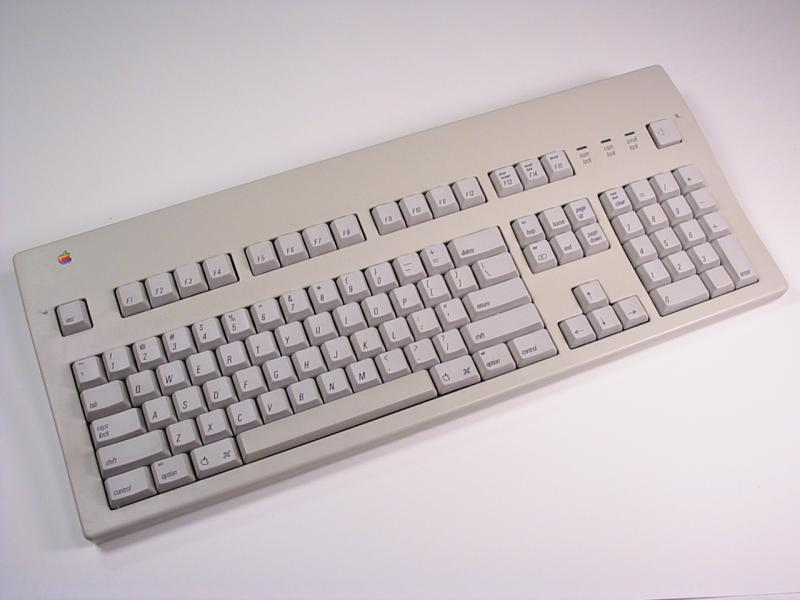
- Apple Extended Keyboard II
- Model no.: M0115 (original); M3501 (II)
- Manufacturer: Apple Computer
- Product family: Apple Keyboard
- Keyswitches: Alps Electric
- Interface: Apple Desktop Bus
- Introduced: March 2, 1987 (original); October 15, 1990 (Extended Keyboard II)
- Discontinued: October 15, 1990 (original); March 14, 1994 (Extended Keyboard II)
- Price: US$163

The Apple Extended Keyboard (AEK, model M0115) is a computer keyboard that was first sold separately alongside the Macintosh II and SE starting in 1987. It was replaced in 1990 by the Apple Extended Keyboard II (AEKII, model M3501) which was pre-packaged with Apple Professional Desktops starting with the Macintosh IIsi.

Both versions were very similar, differing primarily with the addition of adjustable height legs in the AEKII and other minor changes. Both used Apple Desktop Bus (ADB) to connect to the host computer, with ports on either side to allow daisy chaining of another input device, typically a computer mouse or trackball.

In 1994, Apple would begin shipping the AppleDesign Keyboard (M2980) which featured only one ADB port and which used rubber dome switches rather than Alps Electric switches.

== Unique features ==
Among the features that make this keyboard unique are:

- A separate power key using a different key cap.
- Caps Lock Key that physically locks down when activated
- Alps Electric Co. brand mechanical key switches
- Large spacing between keys, especially the top function keys and others.
- The width of the keyboard matches the width of the Macintosh II.
- The height allows it to fit under the "chin" of the Macintosh SE.
- Two small cylinders project vertically from the top of the keyboard on either side of the function keys. These were used to hold templates with application-specific key guides.

== Design ==
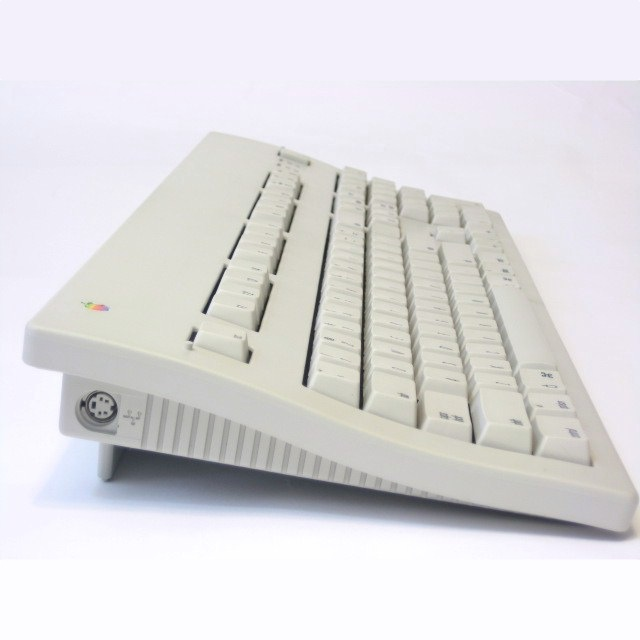
This side view of the Extended II shows its S-shaped upper surface, one of the two ADB ports, the deep serrated case which can rest on the desktop, and the single wide support leg that angles it upward.

The original Apple Extended Keyboard's case was sloped upward towards the rear so that when viewed from the side it formed a continuous convex curve. The case extended downward to sit on the desk, so it provided considerable internal volume. The case also had a significant amount of empty space at the rear, behind the top row of keys. This made for a relatively large and heavy case. The plastic of the case shell below the keyboard section on top was serrated, a common detail found on many Apple products of the era.

Unlike previous Macintosh keyboards, the key layout was very similar to the IBM PC/AT's keyboard, in order to improve usability of MS-DOS programs (run via emulation or coprocessor board).

The II used an updated design that looked like a backward S when viewed from the side, starting relatively flat to the surface, sloping upward through the section where the keys were situated, and then flattening out again at the back where the function keys were placed. The case did not extend down under the keyboard as much, instead, it was raised off the desk by an adjustable foot at the back. This design was lighter than the original at 3.75 pounds (1.70 kg) but otherwise similar in size.

The design patent for the Extended Keyboard II (D335,228) was filed on November 15, 1990.

In 1988 Apple Ireland commissioned Design ID, an industrial design consultancy based in Limerick, to assist with the development of the Extended Keyboard II. Original concepts were by Bryan Leech and Peter Sheehan. For the final proposal quieter key mechanisms were sourced, tested and specified, an adjustable foot was incorporated in the base and the keys were positioned to conform to European ergonomic standards. The ‘S curve profile’ matched the curving terraced key layout and was central to delivering the ergonomic improvements - aesthetics and function in a simple visual gesture.

The first working prototype of the Extended Keyboard II was produced at Design ID by Richard Howe, Donal Ryan and John Fitzgerald.

Steven Peart of frogdesign was responsible for supplementary industrial design work and DFMA (Design for Manufacture and Assembly). Dexter Francis (Apple Peripheral Products Group) was the Apple in-house project lead/product designer.

== See also ==
- Apple Keyboard
