= Smart Battery System =

Smart battery management specification

Smart Battery System (SBS) is a specification for managing a smart battery, usually for a portable computer. It allows operating systems to perform power management operations via a smart battery charger based on remaining estimated run times by determining accurate state of charge readings. Through this communication, the system also controls the battery charge rate. Communication is carried over an SMBus two-wire communication bus. The specification originated with the Duracell and Intel companies in 1994, but was later adopted by several battery and semiconductor makers. The Smart Battery System defines the SMBus connection, the data that can be sent over the connection (Smart Battery Data or SBD), the Smart Battery Charger, and a computer BIOS interface for control. In principle, any battery operated product can use SBS.

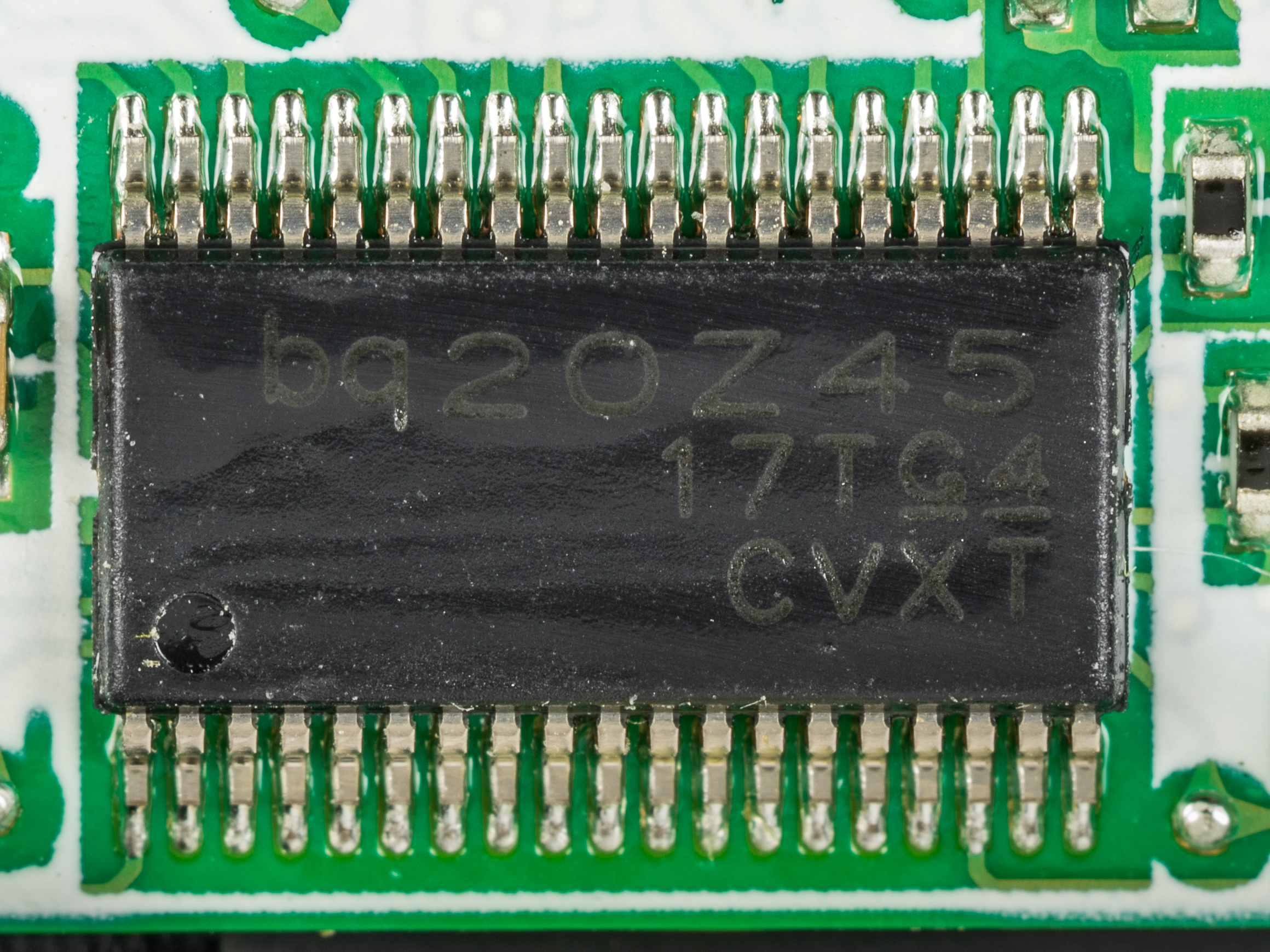
Texas Instruments BQ20Z45: SBS 1.1-compliant gas gauge and protection enabled with impedance track

A special integrated circuit in the battery pack (called a fuel gauge or battery management system) monitors the battery and reports information to the SMBus. This information might include battery type, model number, manufacturer, characteristics, charge/discharge rate, predicted remaining capacity, an almost-discharged alarm so that the PC or other device can shut down gracefully, and temperature and voltage to provide safe fast-charging.

== See also ==
- List of battery types
- Power Management Bus (PMBus)
