= Peripheral bus =

In computing, a peripheral bus is a computer bus designed to support computer peripherals like printers and hard drives. The term is generally used to refer to systems that offer support for a wide variety of devices, like Universal Serial Bus, as opposed to those that are dedicated to specific types of hardware. Serial AT Attachment, or SATA is designed and optimized for communication with mass storage devices.

This usage is not universal, some definitions of peripheral bus include any bus that is not a system bus, including examples like PCI. Others treat PCI and similar systems as a third category, the expansion bus.

== Examples ==
- Universal Serial Bus (USB)
- FireWire
- ACCESS.bus
- Apple Desktop Bus
