= Apple Desktop Bus =

Proprietary bit-serial peripheral bus

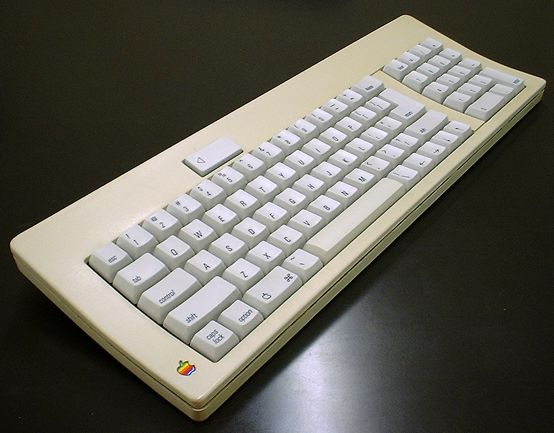
- The Apple Desktop Bus icon and an early Apple Desktop Bus keyboard
- Type: Human input device interface

Production history
- Designer: Apple Computer
- Designed: 1986; 40 years ago
- Manufacturer: Apple Computer Inc.
- Produced: 1986 to 1999
- Superseded: RS-422/6522 keyboard and mouse
- Superseded by: USB (1998–1999)

General specifications
- Hot pluggable: occasional support
- External: yes
- Pins: 4
- Connector: Mini-DIN

Data
- Data signal: Bi-directional serial command stream
- Bitrate: 125 kbit/s maximum (~10 kbit/s actual)
- Max. devices: 16 maximum (~5 actual, 3 supported)
- Protocol: Serial

Pinout
- Female socket from the front
Pin 1	Apple Device Bus	Data
Pin 2	PSW	Power on
Pin 3	+5 V	+5 volts power
Pin 4	GND	Ground
- Same connector as S-Video

Apple Desktop Bus (ADB) is a proprietary bit-serial peripheral bus connecting low-speed devices to computers. It was introduced on the Apple IIGS in 1986 as a way to support low-cost devices like keyboards and mice, enabling them to be connected together in a daisy chain without the need for hubs or other devices. Apple Desktop Bus was quickly introduced on later Macintosh models, on later models of NeXT computers, and saw some other third-party use as well. Like the similar PS/2 connector used in many PC-compatibles at the time, Apple Desktop Bus was rapidly replaced by USB as that system became popular in the late 1990s; the last external Apple Desktop Bus port on an Apple product was in 1999, though it remained as an internal-only bus on some Mac models into the 2000s.

== History ==
=== AppleBus ===
Early during the creation of the Macintosh computer, the engineering team had selected the fairly sophisticated Zilog 8530 to supply serial communications. This was initially done to allow multiple devices to be plugged into a single port, using simple communication protocols implemented inside the 8530 to allow them to send and receive data with the host computer. The idea was to allow multiple devices to be connected to a port, eliminating the need for many different types of ports or the use of expansion slots.

During development of this AppleBus system, computer networking became a vitally important feature of any computer system. With no card slots, the Macintosh was unable to easily add support for Ethernet or similar local area networking standards. Work on AppleBus was re-directed to networking purposes, and was released in 1985 as the AppleTalk system. This left the Mac with the original single-purpose mouse and keyboard ports, and no general-purpose system for low-speed devices to use.

=== Apple Desktop Bus ===
The first system to use Apple Desktop Bus was the Apple IIGS of 1986. It was used on all Apple Macintosh machines starting with the Macintosh II and Macintosh SE. Apple Desktop Bus was also used on later models of NeXT computers. The vast majority of Apple Desktop Bus devices are for input, including trackballs, joysticks, graphics tablets and similar devices. Special-purpose uses included software protection dongles and even the TelePort modem.

=== Move to USB ===
The first Macintosh to move on from Apple Desktop Bus was the iMac in 1998, which uses USB in its place. The last Apple computer to have an Apple Desktop Bus port is the Power Macintosh G3 (Blue and White) in 1999. PowerPC-based PowerBooks and iBooks still used the Apple Desktop Bus protocol in the internal interface with the built-in keyboard and touchpad. Subsequent models use a USB-based trackpad.

== Design ==
=== Physical ===
In keeping with Apple's general philosophy of industrial design, Apple Desktop Bus was intended to be as simple to use as possible, while still being inexpensive to implement. A suitable connector was found in the 4-pin mini-DIN, which is also used for S-Video. In fact, many S-Video cables can be successfully used in place of their ADB counterparts. However, pins one and two on some (mainly lower-end) cables are bridged together, which can result in catastrophic damage to the system or ADB device. The connectors are small, widely available, and can only be inserted the "correct way". They do not lock into position, but even with a friction fit, they are firm enough for light duties like ADB.

ADB protocol requires only a single pin for data, labeled Apple Desktop Bus. The data signal is self-clocking by sending a 0 as low for 65 microseconds and high for 35 μs, while sending a 1 uses the opposite timing. It is a multi-drop open collector design with pull-ups to 5 V and uses collision detection to avoid device ID conflicts as well as clock stretching on the stop bit to indicate that a device requires a service request. Two of the other pins are used for +5 V power and ground. The +5 V pin guarantees at least 500 mA, and requires devices to use only 100 mA each. ADB also includes the PSW (Power Switch) pin which is attached directly to the power supply of the host computer. This is included to allow a keypress on the keyboard to start the machine without needing the ADB software to interpret the signal. In more modern designs, an auxiliary microcontroller is always kept running, so it is economical to use a power-up command over the standard USB channel.

The decoding transceiver ASIC as well as associated patents were controlled by Apple; this required vendors to work with Apple. In the Macintosh SE, the Apple Desktop Bus is implemented in an Apple-branded Microchip PIC16CR54 microcontroller.

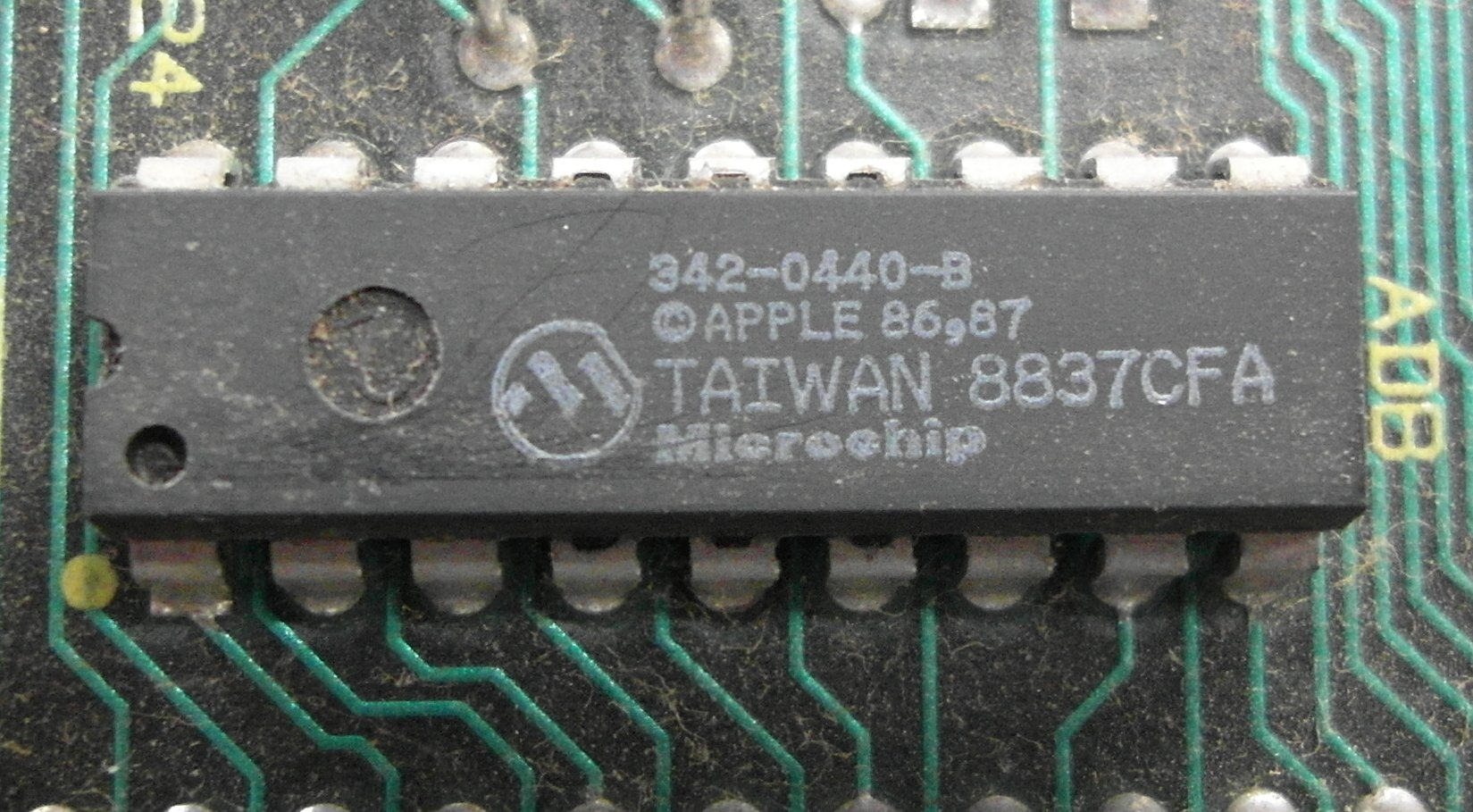
ADB is implemented in an early Microchip PIC microcontroller in the Macintosh SE.

=== Communication ===
The Apple Desktop Bus system is based around the devices having the ability to decode a single number (the address) and being able to hold several small items of data (their registers). All traffic on the bus is driven by the host computer, which sends out commands to read or write data: devices are not allowed to use the bus unless the computer first requests it.

These requests take the form of single-byte strings. The upper four bits contain the address, the ID of one of the devices on the chain. The four bits allow for up to 16 devices on a single bus. The next two bits specify one of four commands, and the final two bits indicate one of four registers. The commands are:

- talk - tells the selected device to send the contents of a register to the computer
- listen - tells the device to set the register to the following value
- flush - clear the contents of a selected register
- reset - tell all devices on the bus to reset

For instance, if the mouse is known to be at address $D, the computer will periodically send out a 1-byte message on the bus that looks something like:

1101 11 00

This says that device $D (1101) should talk (11) and return the contents of register zero (00). To a mouse this means "tell me the latest position changes". Registers can contain between two and eight bytes. Register zero is generally the primary communications channel. Registers one and two are undefined, and are generally intended to allow 3rd party developers to store configuration information. Register three always contains device identification information.

=== Enumeration and identification ===
The addresses and enumeration of the devices are set to default values when reset. For instance, all keyboards are set to $2, and all mice to $3. When the machine is first powered on, the ADB device driver will send out talk commands asking each of these known default addresses, in turn, for the contents of register three. If no response comes from a particular address, the computer marks it dead and doesn't bother polling it later.

If a device does respond, it does so by saying it is moving to a new randomly selected higher address. The computer then responds by sending another command to that new address, asking the device to move to yet another new address. Once this completes, that device is marked live, and the system continues polling it in the future. Once all of the devices are enumerated in this fashion, the bus is ready to be used.

Although it was not common, it is possible for the Apple Desktop Bus to have more than one device of the same sort plugged in — two graphics tablets or software copy protection dongles, for instance. In this case when it asks for devices on that default address, both will respond and a collision could occur. The devices include a small timing variation that allows them to avoid this problem. After receiving a message from the host, the devices wait a short random time before responding, and then only do so after "snooping" the bus to make sure it was not busy.

With two dongles plugged in, for instance, when the bus is first setting up and queries that address, one of them will be the first to respond due to the random wait timer. The other will notice the bus was busy and not respond. The host will then send out another message to that original address, but since one device has moved to a new address, only the other will then respond. This process continues until nothing responds to the request on the original address, meaning there are no more devices of that type to enumerate.

Data rates on the bus are theoretically as high as 125 kbit/s. However, the throughput is at best half that, due to there being only one pin being shared between the computer and devices, and in practice, throughput is even less, as the entire system was driven by how fast the computer polls the bus. The classic Mac OS is not particularly well suited to this task, and the bus often slows to about 10 kbit/s. Early Teleport modems running at 2400 bit/s have no problems using Apple Desktop Bus, but later models were forced to move to the more expensive RS-422 ports as speeds moved to 14.4 kbit/s and higher.

== Problems ==
While Mini-DIN connectors cannot be plugged in the "wrong way", it is possible to have trouble finding the right way without looking inside the circular connector's shroud. Apple attempted to help by using U-shaped soft plastic grips around the connectors to key both plugs and sockets so the flat side has a specific relation to the shell keyway, but this feature was ignored by some third-party manufacturers. Additionally, there are four ways to orient the receiving socket on a device such as a keyboard; various Apple keyboards use at least three of these possible orientations.

The mini-DIN connector is only rated for 400 insertions and it is easy to bend a pin if not inserted with caution; in addition, the socket can become loose, resulting in intermittent function.

Some Apple Desktop Bus devices lack a pass-through connector, making it impossible to daisy-chain more than one such device at a time without obscure splitter units. Few mice or trackballs have them.

In spite of being electrically unsafe for hot-swapping on all but a few machines, ADB has all the basic capabilities needed for hot-swapping (like modern buses) implemented in its software and hardware. On practically all original Apple Desktop Bus systems, it is not safe to plug a device once the system is powered on. This can cause the opening of a soldered-in fuse on the motherboard. If brought to an authorised dealer, this can result in a motherboard swap at a significant expense. The simpler alternative is to obtain a fuse at a nominal cost and wire it in parallel across the open motherboard fuse (not necessarily requiring soldering).

== Patents ==
- 4,875,158 Ashkin; Peter B. (Los Gatos, CA), Clark; Michael (Glendale, CA)
- 4,910,655 Ashkin; Peter B. (Los Gatos, CA), Clark; Michael (Glendale, CA)
- 4,912,627 Ashkin; Peter B. (Los Gatos, CA), Clark; Michael (Glendale, CA)
- 4,918,598 Ashkin; Peter B. (Los Gatos, CA), Clark; Michael (Glendale, CA)
- 5,128,677 Donovan; Paul M. (Santa Clara, CA), Caruso; Michael P. (Sudbury, MA)
- 5,175,750 Donovan; Paul M. (Santa Clara, CA), Caruso; Michael P. (Sudbury, MA)
- 5,828,857 Scalise; Albert M. (San Jose, CA)

== See also ==
- List of device bandwidths
- HP-IL
- ACCESS.bus
