= Memory effect =

Capacity loss in rechargeable batteries

Memory effect, also known as battery effect, lazy battery effect, or battery memory, is an effect observed in nickel-cadmium rechargeable batteries that causes them to hold less charge. It describes the situation in which nickel-cadmium batteries gradually lose their maximum energy capacity if they are repeatedly recharged after being only partially discharged. The battery appears to "remember" the smaller capacity.

== True memory effect ==
The term "memory" came from an aerospace nickel-cadmium application in which the cells were repeatedly discharged to 25% of available capacity (give or take 1%) by exacting computer control, then recharged to 100% capacity without overcharge. This long-term, repetitive cycle régime, with no provision for overcharge, resulted in a loss of capacity beyond the 25% discharge point. True memory cannot exist if any one (or more) of the following conditions holds:

- batteries achieve full overcharge.
- discharge is not exactly the same each cycle, within plus or minus 3%
- discharge is to less than 1.0 volt per cell

True memory-effect is specific to sintered-plate nickel-cadmium cells, and is exceedingly difficult to reproduce, especially in lower ampere-hour cells. In one particular test program designed to induce the effect, none was found after more than 700 precisely-controlled charge/discharge cycles. In the program, spirally-wound one-ampere-hour cells were used. In a follow-up program, 20-ampere-hour aerospace-type cells were used on a similar test régime; memory effects were observed after a few hundred cycles.

== Other problems perceived as memory effect ==
Phenomena which are not true memory effects may also occur in battery types other than sintered-plate nickel-cadmium cells. In particular, lithium-based cells, not normally subject to the memory effect, may change their voltage levels so that a virtual decrease of capacity may be perceived by the battery control system.

=== Temporary effects ===
==== Voltage depression due to long-term over-charging ====
A common process often ascribed to memory effect is voltage depression. In this case, the output voltage of the battery drops more quickly than normal as it is used, even though the total capacity remains almost the same. In modern electronic equipment that monitors the voltage to indicate battery charge, the battery appears to be draining very quickly. To the user, it appears the battery is not holding its full charge, which seems similar to memory effect.

This is a common problem with high-load devices such as special-purpose digital cameras and smart phones, as digital cameras use a large, quick burst of energy for creating each flash of light, smart phones continue operating even while "off" (defragmenting, cloud synchronizing, running certain applications in the background), and both digital cameras and smart phones write a large amount of data to memory (high-resolution picture-taking and continuous audio/video-streaming respectively) in very short periods of time.

Voltage depression is caused by repeated over-charging of a battery, which causes the formation (precipitation) of small solid crystals of electrolyte on the plates, called various names when grown to significant lengths, such as Whiskers, Dendrites, and Crystals. These "scabs" on the surfaces of the charged plates cover up useful surface area, that surface area being used for ion exchange (i.e., moving electric charge via the electrolytic "liquid") when the battery is operating correctly. This scab increases resistance and lowers the voltage of some individual cells in the battery. This causes the battery as a whole to seem to discharge rapidly as those individual cells discharge quickly and the voltage of the battery as a whole suddenly falls. This effect is very common, as consumer trickle chargers typically overcharge. Nickel–metal hydride batteries, for example, are known to experience this form of capacity loss often mistakenly attributed to memory effect.

===== Repair =====
The effect can be overcome by subjecting each cell of the battery to one or more deep charge/discharge cycles, where the central idea is to provide just enough current in the extremely-small-diameter (and therefore high-resistance) whiskers to create enough heat during a cycle(s) of charging and discharging to "melt" (dissolve) the solid whiskers back into the electrolyte liquid, thereby removing the short (the electrical path between opposite-charged sheets) that allowed charge to dissipate faster.

This must be done to the individual cells within a battery, not a multi-cell battery; in a battery, some cells may discharge before others, resulting in those cells being subjected to a reverse charging current by the remaining cells, potentially leading to irreversible damage.

Whiskers can also form (i.e., "precipitate") after the temperature of the battery's internals has decreased, the underlying cause being the electrolyte liquid transitioning into a supersaturated state and therefore growing on the existing charged sheets (the nucleation points) in order to reduce the undesirably large ion concentration within the liquid.

To help prevent this cause of whisker formation, it's important to maintain (refill) electrolytic fluid levels in certain types of batteries that are prone to gas release (e.g., Hydrogen-gas release safety feature).

==== High temperatures ====
High temperatures can also reduce the charged voltage and the charge accepted by the cells.

==== Other causes ====
- Operation below 32 °F (0 °C)
- High discharge rates (above 5C) in a battery not specifically designed for such use
- Inadequate charging time
- Defective charger

=== Permanent loss of capacity ===
==== Deep discharge ====
Some rechargeable batteries can be damaged by repeated deep discharge. Batteries are composed of multiple similar, but not identical, cells. Each cell has its own charge capacity. As the battery as a whole is being deeply discharged, the cell with the smallest capacity may reach zero charge and will "reverse charge" as the other cells continue to force current through it. The resulting loss of capacity is often ascribed to the memory effect.

Battery users may attempt to avoid the memory effect proper by fully discharging their battery packs. This practice is likely to cause more damage as one of the cells will be deep discharged. The damage is focused on the weakest cell, so that each additional full discharge will cause more and more damage to that cell. Repeated deep discharges can exacerbate the degradation of the weakest cell, leading to an imbalance in the battery pack, where the affected cell becomes a limiting factor in overall performance. Over time, this imbalance can result in reduced capacity, shorter run times, and the potential for overcharging or overheating of the other cells, further compromising the battery's safety and longevity.

==== Age and use—normal end-of-life ====
All rechargeable batteries have a finite lifespan and will slowly lose storage capacity as they age due to secondary chemical reactions within the battery whether it is used or not. Some cells may fail sooner than others, but the effect is to reduce the voltage of the battery. Lithium-based batteries have one of the longest idle lives of any construction. Unfortunately the number of operational cycles is still quite low at approximately 400–1200 complete charge/discharge cycles. The lifetime of lithium batteries decreases at higher temperature and states of charge (SoC), whether used or not; maximum life of lithium cells when not in use (that is, storage) is achieved by refrigerating (without freezing) while charged to 30%–50% SoC. To prevent overdischarge, battery should be brought back to room temperature and recharged to 50% SoC once every six months or once per year.

== See also ==
- Battery
- Battery recycling
- List of battery types
- Comparison of commercial battery types
- Battery charger
- Smart battery
- Battery management system
- Battery balancing
- Charge controller
