= State of health =

Performance metric characterizing the condition of a battery

State of health (SoH) is a figure of merit of the condition of a battery (or a cell, or a battery pack), compared to its ideal conditions. The unit of SoH is percent (100% = the battery's conditions match the battery's specifications). For example, when the capacity of a new battery is same as the nominal capacity as per the battery specification, it is said to be in optimal health (SoH = 100%). As the battery is further utilized in a device, its health as in its capacity and other useful parameters deteriorate till it reaches the end of life (SoH = ~70-80%). Consequently, such batteries are replaced from regular usage pertaining to their unstable and unreliable performance.

Typically, a battery's SoH will be 100% at the time of manufacture and will decrease over time and use. However, a battery's performance at the time of manufacture may not meet its specifications, in which case its initial SoH will be less than 100%. In the domain of electric vehicles, the biggest factors that contribute to battery degradation are driver patterns, driver aggression, climate, cabin thermal dynamics, and infrastructure, with driver patterns and climate being the biggest.

== SoH evaluation ==
- First, a battery management system evaluates the SoH of the battery under its management and reports it.
- Then, the SoH is compared to a threshold (typically done by the application in which the battery is used), to determine the suitability of the battery to a given application.

Knowing the SoH of a given battery and the SoH threshold of a given application:

- a determination can be made whether the present battery conditions make it suitable for that application
- an estimate can be made of the battery's useful lifetime in that application

=== Parameters ===
As SoH does not correspond to a particular physical quality, there is no consensus in the industry on how SoH should be determined. The designer of a battery management system may use any of the following parameters (singly or in combination) to derive an arbitrary value for the SoH.

- Internal resistance / impedance / conductance
- Capacity
- Voltage
- Self-discharge
- Ability to accept a charge
- Number of charge–discharge cycles
- Age of the battery
- Temperature of battery during its previous uses
- Total energy charged and discharged

In addition, the designer of the battery management system defines an arbitrary weight for each of the parameter's contribution to the SoH value. The definition of how SoH is evaluated can be a trade secret.

== SoH threshold ==
As stated before, the method by which the battery management system evaluates the SoH of a battery is arbitrary. Similarly, the SoH threshold below which an application deems a particular battery unsuitable is also arbitrary; a given application may accept a battery with a SoH of 50% and above, while a more critical application may only accept batteries with a SoH of 90% and above.

In general, the first usage of batteries is limited to the SoH values of ~70-80% for electric vehicles and electronic equipment. Typically this relates to instantaneous drops in the supplied voltage, and subsequent inability for the connected power electronics to operate normally.

== See also ==
- Battery balancer
- Battery charger
- Battery fade
- Battery monitoring
- Depth of discharge
- Recovery effect
- State of charge
