= Nickel–cadmium battery =

Type of rechargeable battery

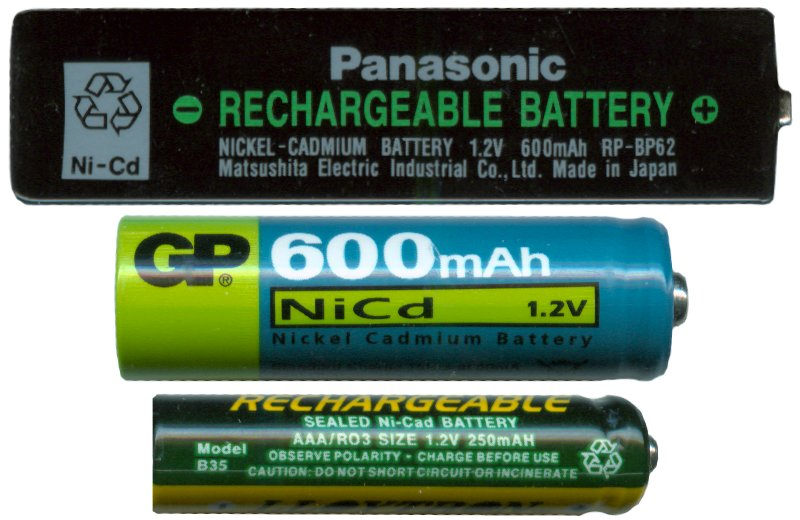
- From top to bottom: "Gumstick", AA, and AAA Ni–Cd batteries
- Specific energy: 40–60 W·h/kg
- Energy density: 50–150 W·h/L
- Specific power: 150 W/kg
- Charge/discharge efficiency: 70–90%
- Self-discharge rate: 10%/month
- Cycle durability: 2,000 cycles
- Nominal cell voltage: 1.2 V

The nickel–cadmium battery (Ni-Cd battery or NiCad battery) is a type of rechargeable battery using nickel oxide hydroxide and metallic cadmium as electrodes. The abbreviation Ni–Cd is derived from the chemical symbols of nickel (Ni) and cadmium (Cd): the abbreviation NiCad is a registered trademark of SAFT Corporation, although this brand name is commonly used to describe all Ni–Cd batteries.

Wet-cell nickel–cadmium batteries were invented in 1899. A Ni–Cd battery has a terminal voltage during discharge of around 1.2 volts which decreases little until nearly the end of discharge. The maximum electromotive force offered by a Ni–Cd cell is 1.3 V. Ni–Cd batteries are made in a wide range of sizes and capacities, from portable sealed types interchangeable with carbon–zinc dry cells, to large ventilated cells used for standby power and motive power. Compared with other types of rechargeable cells they offer good cycle life and performance at low temperatures with a fair capacity but their significant advantage is the ability to deliver practically their full rated capacity at high discharge rates (discharging in one hour or less). However, the materials are more costly than that of the lead–acid battery, and the cells have high self-discharge rates.

Sealed Ni–Cd cells were at one time widely used in portable power tools, photography equipment, flashlights, emergency lighting, hobby RC, and portable electronic devices. The superior capacity of nickel–metal hydride batteries, and recent lower cost, has largely supplanted Ni–Cd use. Further, the environmental impact of the disposal of the toxic metal cadmium has contributed considerably to the reduction in their use. Within the European Union, Ni–Cd batteries can now only be supplied for replacement purposes or for certain types of new equipment such as medical devices.

Larger ventilated wet cell Ni–Cd batteries are used in emergency lighting, standby power, and uninterruptible power supplies and other applications.

== History ==
The first Ni–Cd battery was created by Waldemar Jungner of Sweden in 1899. At that time, the only direct competitor was the lead–acid battery, which was less physically and chemically robust. With minor improvements to the first prototypes, energy density rapidly increased to about half of that of primary batteries, and significantly greater than lead–acid batteries. Jungner experimented with substituting iron for the cadmium in varying quantities, but found the iron formulations to be wanting. Jungner's work was largely unknown in the United States. Thomas Edison patented a nickel– or cobalt–cadmium battery in 1902, and adapted the battery design when he introduced the nickel–iron battery to the US two years after Jungner had built one. In 1906, Jungner established a factory close to Oskarshamn, Sweden, to produce flooded design Ni–Cd batteries

In 1932, active materials were deposited inside a porous nickel-plated electrode and fifteen years later work began on a sealed nickel–cadmium battery.

The first production in the United States began in 1946. Up to this point, the batteries were "pocket type," constructed of nickel-plated steel pockets containing nickel and cadmium active materials. Around the middle of the twentieth century, sintered-plate Ni–Cd batteries became increasingly popular. Fusing nickel powder at a temperature well below its melting point using high pressures creates sintered plates. The plates thus formed are highly porous, about 80 percent by volume. Positive and negative plates are produced by soaking the nickel plates in nickel- and cadmium-active materials, respectively. Sintered plates are usually much thinner than the pocket type, resulting in greater surface area per volume and higher currents. In general, the greater amount of reactive material surface area in a battery, the lower its internal resistance.

Since the 2000s, all consumer Ni–Cd batteries use the jelly-roll configuration.

== Characteristics ==
The maximum discharge rate for a Ni–Cd battery varies by size. For a common AA-size cell, the maximum discharge rate is approximately 1.8 amperes; for a D size battery the discharge rate can be as high as 3.5 amperes.

Model-aircraft or -boat builders often take much larger currents of up to a hundred amps or so from specially constructed Ni–Cd batteries, which are used to drive main motors. 5–6 minutes of model operation is easily achievable from quite small batteries, so a reasonably high power-to-weight figure is achieved, comparable to internal combustion motors, though of lesser duration. In this, however, they have been largely superseded by lithium polymer (LiPo) and lithium iron phosphate (LiFe) batteries, which can provide even higher energy densities.

=== Voltage ===
Ni–Cd cells have a nominal cell potential of 1.2 volts (V). This is lower than the 1.5 V of alkaline and zinc–carbon primary cells, and consequently they are not appropriate as a replacement in all applications. However, the 1.5 V of a primary alkaline cell refers to its initial, rather than average, voltage. Unlike alkaline and zinc–carbon primary cells, a Ni–Cd cell's terminal voltage only changes a little as it discharges. Because many electronic devices are designed to work with primary cells that may discharge to as low as 0.90 to 1.0 V per cell, the relatively steady 1.2 V of a Ni–Cd cell is enough to allow operation. Some would consider the near-constant voltage a drawback as it makes it difficult to detect the remaining chemical charge capacity of an operating cell.

Ni–Cd batteries used to replace 9 V batteries usually only have six cells, for a terminal voltage of 7.2 volts. While most pocket radios will operate satisfactorily at this voltage, some manufacturers such as Varta made 8.4 volt batteries with seven cells for more critical applications.

=== Charging ===
Ni–Cd batteries can be charged at several different rates, depending on how the cell was manufactured. The charge rate is measured based on the percentage of the amp-hour capacity the battery is fed as a steady current over the duration of the charge. Regardless of the charge speed, more energy must be supplied to the battery than its actual capacity, to account for energy loss during charging, with faster charges being more efficient. For example, an "overnight" charge, might consist of supplying a current equal to one tenth the ampere-hour rating (C/10) for 14–16 hours; that is, a 100 mAh battery takes 10 mA for 14 hours, for a total of 140 mAh to charge at this rate. At the rapid-charge rate, done at 100% of the rated capacity of the battery in 1 hour (1C), the battery holds roughly 80% of the charge, so a 100 mAh battery takes 125 mAh to charge (that is, approximately 1 hour and fifteen minutes). Some specialized batteries can be charged in as little as 10–15 minutes at a 4C or 6C charge rate, but this is very uncommon. It also greatly increases the risk of the cells overheating and venting due to an internal over-pressure condition: the cell's rate of temperature rise is governed by its internal resistance and the square of the charging rate. At a 4C rate, the amount of heat generated in the cell is sixteen times higher than the heat at the 1C rate. The downside to faster charging is the higher risk of overcharging, which can damage the battery. and the increased temperatures the cell has to endure (which potentially shortens its life).

The safe temperature range when in use is between −20 °C and 45 °C. During charging, the battery temperature typically stays low, around the same as the ambient temperature (the charging reaction absorbs energy), but as the battery nears full charge the temperature will rise to 45–50 °C. Some battery chargers detect this temperature increase to cut off charging and prevent over-charging.

When not under load or charge, a Ni–Cd battery will self-discharge approximately 10% per month at 20 °C, ranging up to 20% per month at higher temperatures. It is possible to perform a trickle charge at current levels just high enough to offset this discharge rate; to keep a battery fully charged. However, if the battery is going to be stored unused for a long period of time, it should be discharged down to at most 40% of capacity (some manufacturers recommend fully discharging and even short-circuiting once fully discharged), and stored in a cool, dry environment.

=== Overcharging ===
Sealed Ni–Cd cells consist of a pressure vessel that is supposed to contain any generation of oxygen and hydrogen gases until they can recombine back to water. Such generation typically occurs during rapid charge and discharge, and exceedingly at overcharge condition. If the pressure exceeds the limit of the safety valve, water in the form of gas is lost. Since the vessel is designed to contain an exact amount of electrolyte this loss will rapidly affect the capacity of the cell and its ability to receive and deliver current. To detect all conditions of overcharge demands great sophistication from the charging circuit and a cheap charger will eventually damage even the best quality cells.

== Electrochemistry ==
A fully charged Ni–Cd cell contains:

- a nickel(III) oxide-hydroxide positive electrode plate
- a cadmium negative electrode plate
- a separator, and
- an alkaline electrolyte (potassium hydroxide).

Ni–Cd batteries usually have a metal case with a sealing plate equipped with a self-sealing safety valve. The positive and negative electrode plates, isolated from each other by the separator, are rolled in a spiral shape inside the case. This is known as the jelly-roll design and allows a Ni–Cd cell to deliver a much higher maximum current than an equivalent size alkaline cell. Alkaline cells have a bobbin construction where the cell casing is filled with electrolyte and contains a graphite rod which acts as the positive electrode. As a relatively small area of the electrode is in contact with the electrolyte (as opposed to the jelly-roll design), the internal resistance for an equivalent sized alkaline cell is higher which limits the maximum current that can be delivered.

The chemical reactions at the cadmium electrode during discharge are:

$$\ce{Cd + 2OH^- -> Cd(OH)2 + 2e^-}$$

The reactions at the nickel oxide electrode are:

$$\ce{2NiO(OH) + 2H2O + 2e^- -> 2Ni(OH)2 + 2OH^-}$$

The net reaction during discharge is

$$\ce{Cd + 2NiO(OH) -> Cd(OH)2 + 2Ni(OH)2.}$$

During recharge, the reactions go from right to left. The alkaline electrolyte (commonly KOH) is not consumed in this reaction and therefore its specific gravity, unlike in lead–acid batteries, is not a guide to its state of charge.

When Jungner built the first Ni–Cd batteries, he used nickel oxide in the positive electrode, and iron and cadmium materials in the negative. It was not until later that pure cadmium metal and nickel hydroxide were used. Until about 1960, the chemical reaction was not completely understood. There were several speculations as to the reaction products. The debate was finally resolved by infrared spectroscopy, which revealed cadmium hydroxide and nickel hydroxide.

Another historically important variation on the basic Ni–Cd cell is the addition of lithium hydroxide to the potassium hydroxide electrolyte. This was believed to prolong the service life by making the cell more resistant to electrical abuse. The Ni–Cd battery in its modern form is extremely resistant to electrical abuse anyway, so this practice has been discontinued.

== Prismatic (industrial) vented-cell batteries ==
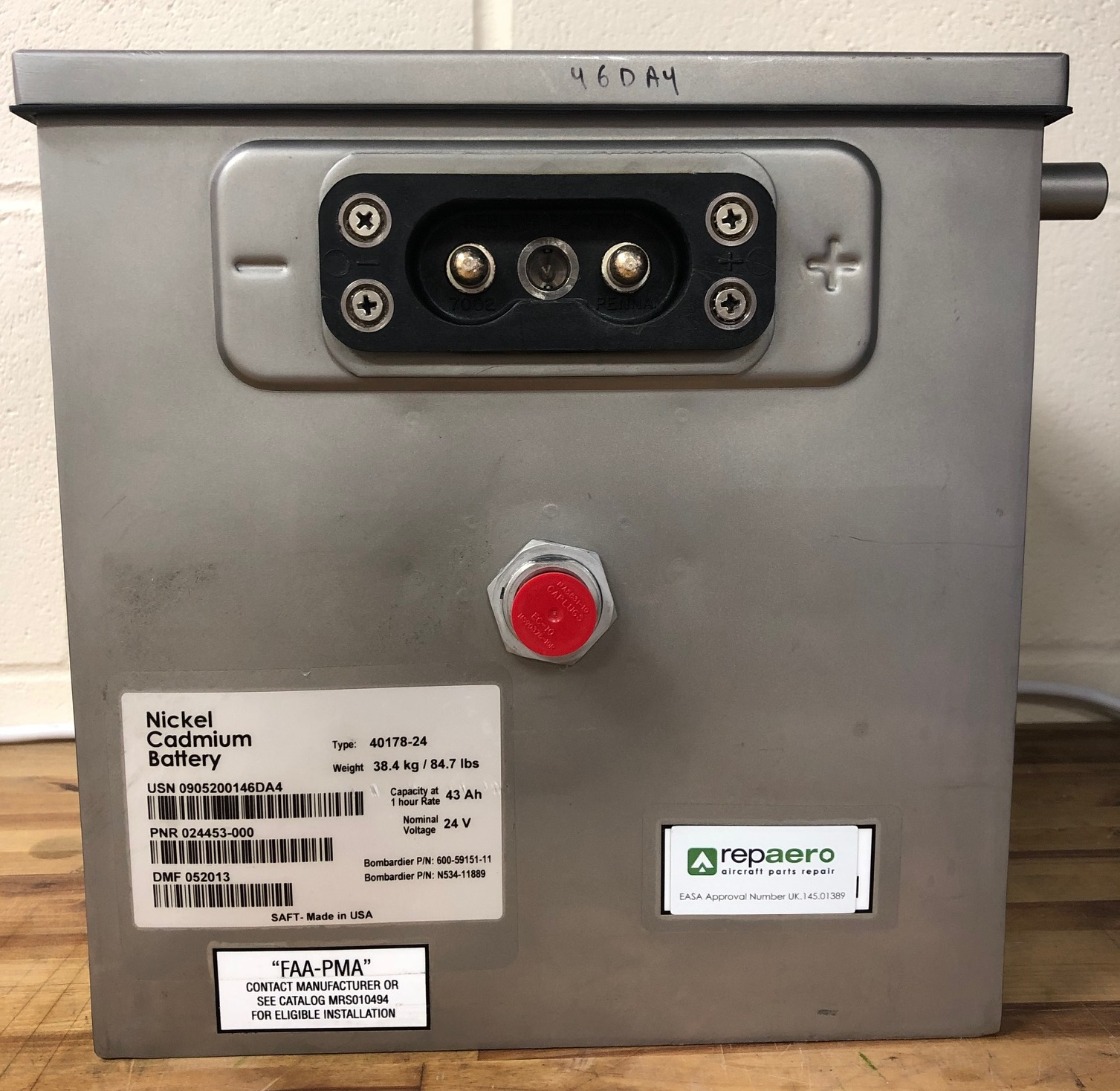
View of a vented-cell aircraft battery from the side

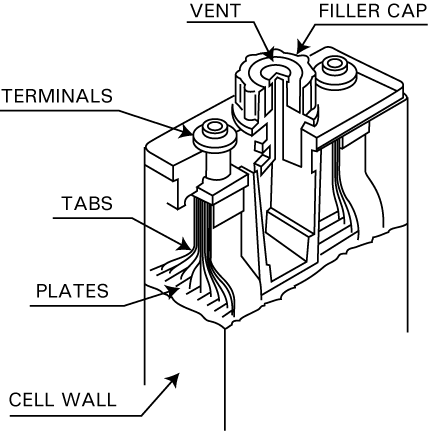
Structure of a cell in a vented-cell battery

Larger flooded cells are used for aircraft starting batteries, standby power and marginally in electric vehicles,

Vented-cell (wet cell, flooded cell) Ni–Cd batteries are used when large capacities and high discharge rates are required. Unlike typical Ni–Cd cells, which are sealed (see next section), vented cells have a vent or low pressure release valve that releases any generated oxygen and hydrogen gases when overcharged or discharged rapidly. Since the battery is not a pressure vessel, it is safer, weighs less, and has a simpler and more economical structure. This also means the battery is not normally damaged by excessive rates of overcharge, discharge or even negative charge.

They are used in aviation, rail and mass transit, backup power for telecoms, engine starting for backup turbines etc. Using vented-cell Ni–Cd batteries results in reduction in size, weight and maintenance requirements over other types of batteries. Vented-cell Ni–Cd batteries have long lives (up to 20 years or more, depending on type) and operate at extreme temperatures (from −40 to 70 °C).

A steel battery box contains the cells connected in series to gain the desired voltage (1.2 V per cell nominal). Cells are usually made of a light and durable polyamide (nylon), with multiple nickel–cadmium plates welded together for each electrode inside. A separator or liner made of silicone rubber acts as an insulator and a gas barrier between the electrodes. Cells are flooded with an electrolyte of 30% aqueous solution of potassium hydroxide (KOH). The specific gravity of the electrolyte does not indicate if the battery is discharged or fully charged but changes mainly with evaporation of water. The top of the cell contains a space for excess electrolyte and a pressure release vent. Large nickel-plated copper studs and thick interconnecting links assure minimum equivalent series resistance for the battery.

The venting of gases means that the battery is either being discharged at a high rate or recharged at a higher than nominal rate. This also means the electrolyte lost during venting must be periodically replaced through routine maintenance. Depending on the charge–discharge cycles and type of battery this can mean a maintenance period of anything from a few months to a year.

Vented-cell voltage rises rapidly at the end of charge allowing for very simple charger circuitry to be used. Typically a battery is constant current charged at 1 CA rate until all the cells have reached at least 1.55 V. Another charge cycle follows at 0.1 CA rate, again until all cells have reached 1.55 V. The charge is finished with an equalizing or top-up charge, typically for not less than 4 hours at 0.1 CA rate. The purpose of the over-charge is to expel as much (if not all) of the gases collected on the electrodes, hydrogen on the negative and oxygen on the positive, and some of these gases recombine to form water which in turn will raise the electrolyte level to its highest level after which it is safe to adjust the electrolyte levels. During the over-charge or top-up charge, the cell voltages will go beyond 1.6 V and then slowly start to drop. No cell should rise above 1.71 V (dry cell) or drop below 1.55 V (gas barrier broken).

In an aircraft installation with a floating battery electrical system the regulator voltage is set to charge the battery at constant potential charge (typically 14 or 28 V). If this voltage is set too high it will result in rapid electrolyte loss. A failed charge regulator may allow the charge voltage to rise well above this value, causing a massive overcharge with boiling over of the electrolyte.

== Sealed (portable) cells ==
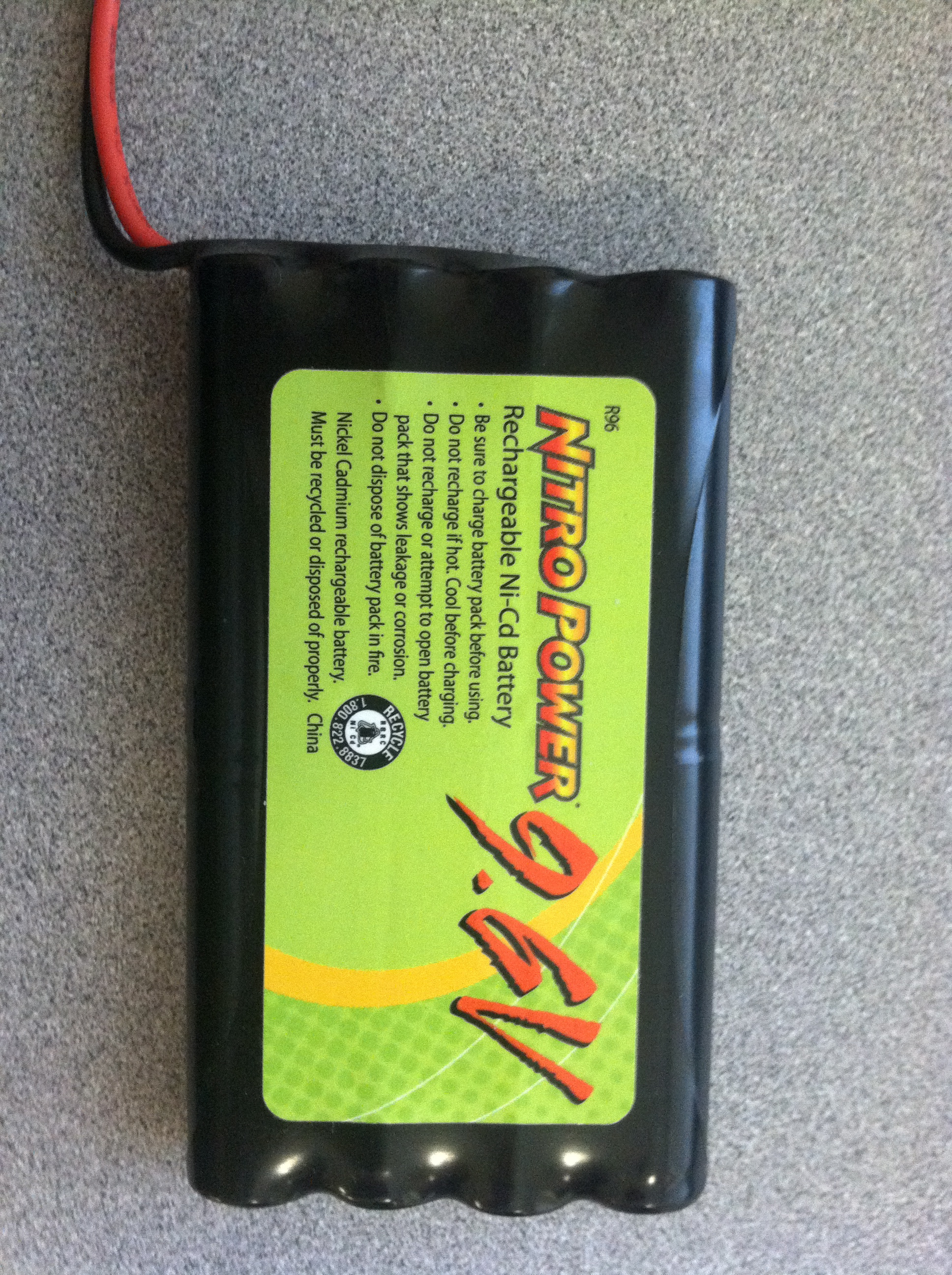
Eight Ni–Cd batteries in a battery pack

Most of the uses described below are shown for historical purposes, as sealed (portable) Ni-Cd batteries have progressively been displaced by higher performance Li-ion cells, and their placing on the EU market has, for the most part, been prohibited since 2006 by the 2006/66/EC EU Batteries Directive.

Sealed Ni–Cd cells were used individually, or assembled into battery packs containing two or more cells. Small cells are used for portable electronics and toys (such as solar garden lights), often using cells manufactured in the same sizes as primary cells. When Ni–Cd batteries are substituted for primary cells, the lower terminal voltage and smaller ampere-hour capacity may reduce performance as compared to primary cells. Miniature button cells are sometimes used in photographic equipment, hand-held lamps (flashlight or torch), computer-memory standby, toys, and novelties.

Specialty Ni–Cd batteries were used in cordless and wireless telephones, emergency lighting, and other applications. With a relatively low internal resistance, they can supply high surge currents. This makes them a favourable choice for remote-controlled electric model airplanes, boats, and cars, as well as cordless power tools and camera flash units.

== Popularity ==
Advances in battery-manufacturing technologies throughout the second half of the twentieth century have made batteries increasingly cheaper to produce. Battery-powered devices in general have increased in popularity. As of 2000, about 1.5 billion Ni–Cd batteries were produced annually. Up until the mid-1990s, Ni–Cd batteries had an overwhelming majority of the market share for rechargeable batteries in home electronics.

At one point, Ni–Cd batteries accounted for 8% of all portable secondary (rechargeable) battery sales in the EU, and in the UK for 9.2% (disposal) and in Switzerland for 1.3% of all portable battery sales.

In the EU, the 2006 Battery Directive restricted sales of Ni–Cd batteries to consumers for portable devices.

== Availability ==
Ni–Cd cells are available in the same sizes as alkaline batteries, from AAA through D, as well as several multi-cell sizes, including the equivalent of a 9-volt battery. A fully charged single Ni–Cd cell, under no load, carries a potential difference of between 1.25 and 1.35 volts, which stays relatively constant as the battery is discharged. Since an alkaline battery near fully discharged may see its voltage drop to as low as 0.9 volts, Ni–Cd cells and alkaline cells are typically interchangeable for most applications.

In addition to single cells, batteries exist that contain up to 300 cells (nominally 360 volts, actual voltage under no load between 380 and 420 volts). This multi-cell design is mostly used in automotive and heavy-duty industrial applications. For portable applications, the number of cells is normally below 18 cells (24 V). Industrial-sized flooded batteries are available with capacities ranging from 12.5 Ah up to several hundred Ah.

== Comparison with other batteries ==
Recently, nickel–metal hydride and lithium-ion batteries have become commercially available and cheaper, the former type now rivaling Ni–Cd batteries in cost. Where energy density is important, Ni–Cd batteries are now at a disadvantage compared with nickel–metal hydride and lithium-ion batteries. However, the Ni–Cd battery is still very useful in applications requiring very high discharge rates because it can endure such discharge with no damage or loss of capacity.

When compared to other forms of rechargeable battery, the Ni–Cd battery has a number of distinct advantages:

- The batteries are more difficult to damage than other batteries, tolerating deep discharge for long periods. In fact, Ni–Cd batteries in long-term storage are typically stored fully discharged. This is in contrast, for example, to lithium ion batteries, which are less stable and will be permanently damaged if discharged below a minimum voltage.
- The battery performs very well under rough conditions, perfect for use in portable tools.
- Ni–Cd batteries typically last longer, in terms of number of charge/discharge cycles, than other rechargeable batteries such as lead/acid batteries.
- Compared to lead–acid batteries, Ni–Cd batteries have a much higher energy density. A Ni–Cd battery is smaller and lighter than a comparable lead–acid battery, but not a comparable NiMH or Li-ion battery. In cases where size and weight are important considerations (for example, aircraft), Ni–Cd batteries are preferred over the cheaper lead–acid batteries.
- In consumer applications, Ni–Cd batteries compete directly with alkaline batteries. A Ni–Cd cell has a lower capacity than that of an equivalent alkaline cell, and costs more. However, since the alkaline battery's chemical reaction is not reversible, a reusable Ni–Cd battery has a significantly longer total lifetime. There have been attempts to create rechargeable alkaline batteries, or specialized battery chargers for charging single-use alkaline batteries, but none that has seen wide usage.
- The terminal voltage of a Ni–Cd battery declines more slowly as it is discharged, compared with carbon–zinc batteries. Since an alkaline battery's voltage drops significantly as the charge drops, most consumer applications are well equipped to deal with the slightly lower Ni–Cd cell voltage with no noticeable loss of performance.
- The capacity of a Ni–Cd battery is not significantly affected by very high discharge currents. Even with discharge rates as high as 50C, a Ni–Cd battery will provide very nearly its rated capacity. By contrast, a lead acid battery will only provide approximately half its rated capacity when discharged at a relatively modest 1.5C.
- The maximum continuous current drain of Ni–Cd battery is commonly around 15C. Compared to NiMH battery where usable maximum continuous current drain is not more than 5C.
- Nickel–metal hydride (NiMH) batteries are the newest, and most similar, competitor to Ni–Cd batteries. Compared to Ni–Cd batteries, NiMH batteries have a higher capacity and are less toxic, and are now more cost effective. However, a Ni–Cd battery has a lower self-discharge rate (for example, 20% per month for a Ni–Cd battery, versus 30% per month for a conventional NiMH under identical conditions), although low self-discharge ("LSD") NiMH batteries are now available, which have substantially lower self-discharge than either Ni–Cd or conventional NiMH batteries. This results in a preference for Ni–Cd over non-LSD NiMH batteries in applications where the current draw on the battery is lower than the battery's own self-discharge rate (for example, television remote controls). In both types of cell, the self-discharge rate is highest for a full charge state and drops off somewhat for lower charge states. Finally, a similarly sized Ni–Cd battery has a slightly lower internal resistance, and thus can achieve a higher maximum discharge rate (which can be important for applications such as power tools).

The primary trade-off with Ni–Cd batteries is their higher cost and the use of cadmium. This heavy metal is an environmental hazard, and is highly toxic to all higher forms of life. They are also more costly than lead–acid batteries because nickel and cadmium cost more. One of the biggest disadvantages is that the battery exhibits a very marked negative temperature coefficient. This means that as the cell temperature rises, the internal resistance falls. This can pose considerable charging problems, particularly with the relatively simple charging systems employed for lead–acid type batteries. Whilst lead–acid batteries can be charged by simply connecting a dynamo to them, with a simple electromagnetic cut-out system for when the dynamo is stationary or an over-current occurs, the Ni–Cd battery under a similar charging scheme would exhibit thermal runaway, where the charging current would continue to rise until the over-current cut-out operated or the battery destroyed itself. This is the principal factor that prevents its use as engine-starting batteries. Today with alternator-based charging systems with solid-state regulators, the construction of a suitable charging system would be relatively simple, but the car manufacturers are reluctant to abandon tried-and-tested technology.

== Memory effect ==
Ni–Cd batteries may suffer from a "memory effect" if they are discharged and recharged to the same state of charge hundreds of times. The apparent symptom is that the battery "remembers" the point in its discharge cycle where recharging began and during subsequent use suffers a sudden drop in voltage at that point, as if the battery had been discharged. The capacity of the battery is not actually reduced substantially. Some electronics designed to be powered by Ni–Cd batteries are able to withstand this reduced voltage long enough for the voltage to return to normal. However, if the device is unable to operate through this period of decreased voltage, it will be unable to get enough energy out of the battery, and for all practical purposes, the battery appears "dead" earlier than normal.

There is evidence that the memory effect story originated from orbiting satellites, where they were similarly charging and discharging with every orbit around the Earth over a period of several years. After this time, it was found that the capacities of the batteries had declined significantly, but were still fit for use. It is unlikely that this precise repetitive charging (for example, 1,000 charges/discharges with less than 2% variability) could ever be reproduced by individuals using electrical goods. The original paper describing the memory effect was written by GE scientists at their Battery Business Department in Gainesville, Florida, and later retracted by them, but the damage was done.

The battery survives thousands of charges/discharges cycles. Also it is possible to lower the memory effect by discharging the battery completely about once a month. This way apparently the battery does not "remember" the point in its charge cycle.

An effect with similar symptoms to the memory effect is the so-called voltage depression or lazy battery effect. This results from repeated overcharging; the symptom is that the battery appears to be fully charged but discharges quickly after only a brief period of operation. In rare cases, much of the lost capacity can be recovered by a few deep-discharge cycles, a function often provided by automatic battery chargers. However, this process may reduce the shelf life of the battery. If treated well, a Ni–Cd battery can last for 1,000 cycles or more before its capacity drops below half its original capacity. Many home chargers claim to be "smart chargers" which will shut down and not damage the battery, but this seems to be a common problem.

== Environmental impact ==
Ni–Cd batteries contain between 6% (for industrial batteries) and 18% (for commercial batteries) cadmium, which is a toxic heavy metal and therefore requires special care during battery disposal.

In the United States, the expected battery recycling cost (to be used for proper disposal at the end of the service lifetime) is rolled into the battery purchase price.

Under the so-called "batteries directive" (2006/66/EC), the sale of consumer Ni–Cd batteries has now been banned within the European Union except for medical use; alarm systems; emergency lighting; and portable power tools. This last category has been banned effective 2016. Under the same EU directive, used industrial Ni–Cd batteries must be collected by their producers in order to be recycled in dedicated facilities.

== See also ==
- Battery recycling
- Comparison of battery types
- List of battery sizes
- List of battery types
- Power-to-weight ratio
