= Recovery effect =

The recovery effect is a phenomenon observed in battery usage where the available energy is less than the difference between energy charged and energy consumed.

== Mechanism ==
Intuitively, this is because the energy has been consumed from the edge of the battery and the charge has not yet diffused evenly around the battery.

When power is extracted continuously voltage decreases in a smooth curve, but the recovery effect can result in the voltage partially increasing if the current is interrupted.

== In non-lead-acid batteries ==
The KiBaM battery model describes the recovery effect for lead-acid batteries and is also a good approximation to the observed effects in Li-ion batteries. In some batteries, the gains from the recovery life can extend battery life by up to 45% by alternating discharging and inactive periods rather than constantly discharging. The size of the recovery effect depends on the battery load, recovery time and depth of discharge.

Even though the recovery effect phenomenon is prominent in the lead acid battery chemistry, its existence in alkaline, Ni-MH and Li-Ion batteries is still questionable. For instance, a systematic experimental case study shows that an intermittent discharge current in case of alkaline, Ni-MH and Li-ion batteries results in a decreased usable energy output compared to a continuous discharge current of the same average value. This is primarily due to the increased overpotential experienced due to the high peak currents of the intermittent discharge over the continuous discharge current of same average value.

== See also ==
- Capacity fading
- State of health
- State of charge
- Smart battery
- Battery management system
