= Capacity loss =

Loss in the capacity of a rechargeable battery to deliver energy

Capacity loss or capacity fading is a phenomenon observed in rechargeable battery usage where the amount of charge a battery can deliver at the rated voltage decreases with use.

In a 2026 meta-analysis, it was reported that the capacity loss in lithium-ion batteries was on average 0.23%/cycle (median 0.04%/cycle) before reaching capacity loss of 20%, by which batteries are generally considered having reached the end of their operational life.

== Stress factors ==
Capacity fading in Li-ion batteries occurs by a multitude of stress factors, including ambient temperature, discharge C-rate, and state of charge (SOC).

Capacity loss is strongly temperature-dependent. Aging rates increase as temperatures rise or fall above or below 25 °C.

Capacity loss is C-rate sensitive and higher C-rates lead to a faster capacity loss on a per cycle. Chemical mechanisms of degradation in a Li-ion battery dominate capacity loss at low C-rates, whereas, mechanical degradation dominates at high C-rates.

Graphite/LiCoO_{2} battery capacity degradation is reported to be affected by mean SOC as well as the change in SOC (ΔSOC) during the cycling operation. For the first 500 equivalent full cycles mean SOC is found to have a major effect on the capacity fade of cells as compared to ΔSOC. However, towards the end of the testing (600~800 equivalent cycles) ΔSOC becomes the major factor affecting the capacity loss rate of the cells.

== See also ==
- Recovery effect
- Nickel-iron battery, a battery that is highly resistant to capacity loss
- Memory effect
