= Undervoltage-lockout =

Electronic circuit that cuts power when voltage falls below its operating range

The undervoltage-lockout (UVLO) is an electronic circuit used to turn off the power of an electronic device in the event of the voltage dropping below the operational value that could cause unpredictable system behavior. For instance, in battery powered embedded devices, UVLOs can be used to monitor the battery voltage and turn off the embedded device's circuit if the battery voltage drops below a specific threshold, thus protecting the associated equipment from deep discharge. Some variants may also have unique values for power-up (positive-going) and power-down (negative-going) thresholds.

== Usages ==
Typical usages include:

- Electrical ballast circuits to switch them off in the event of voltage falling below the operational value.
- Switched-mode power supplies. When the system supply output impedance is higher than the input impedance of the regulator, an UVLO with a higher hysteresis should be used to prevent oscillations before settling down to a steady state and possible malfunctions of the regulator.

== See also ==
- Battery management system
- Brown-out (electricity)
- No-volt release
