= Hydrogen battery =

Hydrogen battery may refer to:

- Nickel–hydrogen battery, a rechargeable battery with a power source based on nickel and hydrogen
- Hydrogen fuel cell, an electrochemical cell that uses hydrogen as a fuel source
