= Quick Charge =

Proprietary charging technology

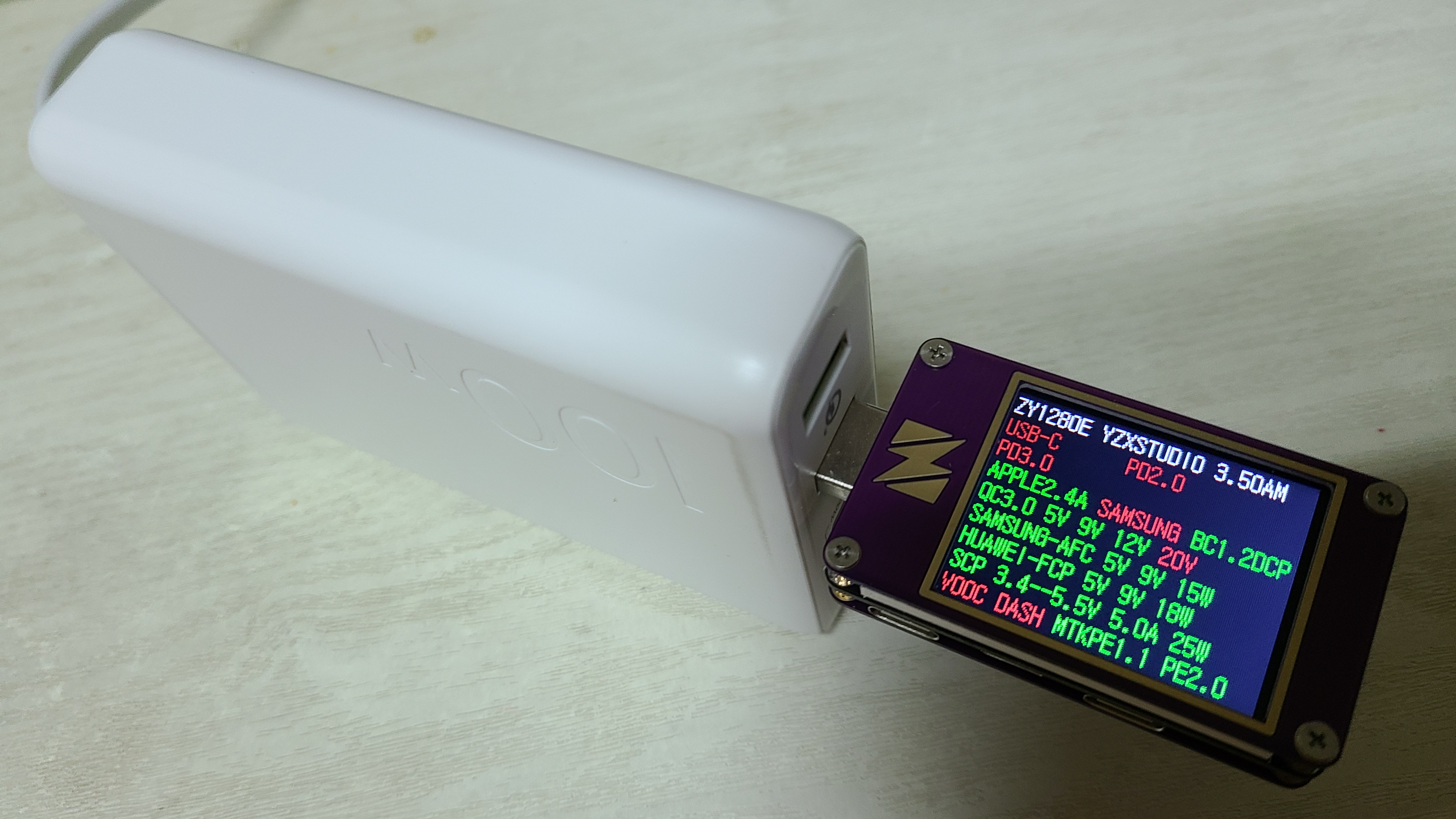
A USB charger that implements QC3.0

Quick Charge (QC) is a proprietary battery charging protocol developed by Qualcomm, used for managing power delivered over USB, mainly by communicating to the power supply and negotiating a voltage.

Quick Charge is used by certain chargers with devices that run on Qualcomm system-on-chip (SoCs), such as some phones. Both the device and charger must support QC for QC charging to happen; alternatively, if either fail to implement QC, then regular USB charging happens instead. QC charges batteries in devices faster than standard USB allows by increasing the output voltage supplied by the USB charger, while adopting techniques to prevent the battery damage caused by uncontrolled fast charging and regulating the incoming voltage internally. Many chargers that implement Quick Charge 2.0 and later are wall adaptors, but it is implemented on some in-car chargers, and some power banks use it to both receive and deliver charge.

Quick Charge is also used by other manufacturers' proprietary rapid-charging systems.

== Details ==
Quick Charge is a proprietary technology that can charge battery-powered devices, primarily mobile phones, at power levels exceeding the 7.5 watts (5 volts at 1.5 amps) possible in the USB BC 1.2 standard, using existing USB cables. The higher voltage available allows more power (watts) to be supplied through wires without excessive heating. As current is lower for the same power if voltage is increased, there is less resistive loss, which becomes significant for longer cables.

Numerous other companies have competing technologies, including MediaTek Pump Express and OPPO VOOC (licensed to OnePlus as Dash Charge), the latter of which supplies higher current without voltage increase, relying on thicker USB wires to handle the current without overheating, as described in VOOC § Technology.

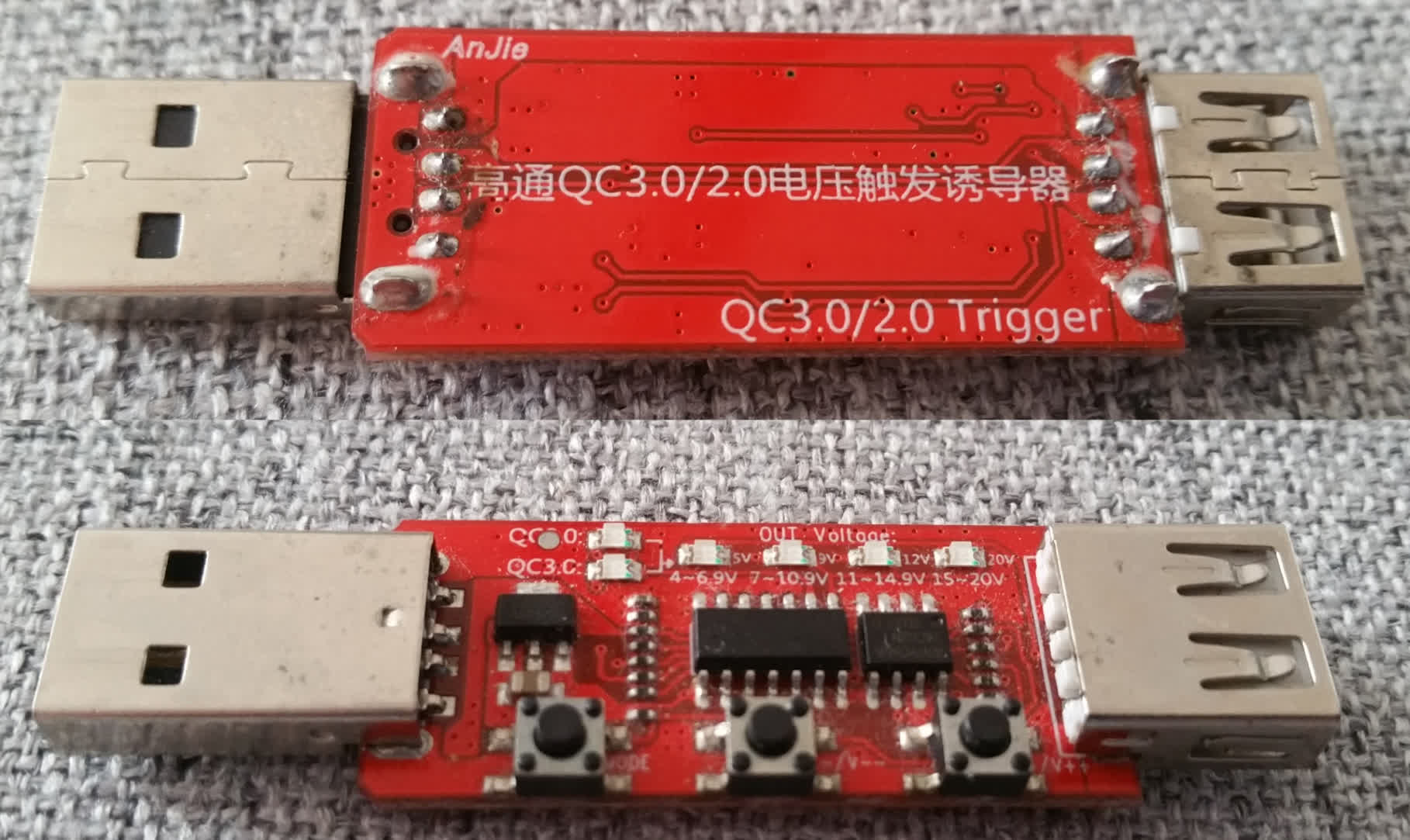
Circuit board to simulate QuickCharge voltage request signals

Though not publicly documented, the voltage negotiation between device and charger has been reverse-engineered, and a custom voltage can be manually requested from the charger using a trigger circuit that simulates the negotiation to an end device.

For Quick Charge charging to happen, both the power supply and the device being charged must implement it; otherwise charging falls back to the standard USB ten watts.

Quick Charge 2.0 introduced an optional feature called Dual Charge (initially called Parallel Charging), using two PMICs to split the power into 2 streams to reduce phone temperature.

Quick Charge 3.0 introduced INOV (Intelligent Negotiation for Optimal Voltage), Battery Saver Technologies, HVDCP+, and optional Dual Charge+. INOV is an algorithm that determines the optimum power transfer while maximizing efficiency. Battery Saver Technologies aims to maintain at least 80% of the battery's original charge capacity after 500 charge cycles. Qualcomm claims Quick Charge 3.0 is up to 4–6 °C cooler, 16% faster and 38% more efficient than Quick Charge 2.0, and that Quick Charge 3.0 with Dual Charge+ is up to 7–8 °C cooler, 27% faster and 45% more efficient than Quick Charge 2.0 with Dual Charge.

Quick Charge 4 was announced in December 2016 for the Snapdragon 835 and later chips. Quick Charge 4 implements HVDCP++, optional Dual Charge++, INOV 3.0, and Battery Saver Technologies 2. It is cross-compatible with both USB-C and USB-PD specifications, with fallback to USB-PD if either the charger or device is not QC-compatible. However, Quick Charge 4 chargers are not backward compatible with Quick Charge 2.0 and 3.0. It also features additional safety measures to protect against over-voltage, over-current and overheating, as well as cable quality detection. Qualcomm claims Quick Charge 4 with Dual Charge++ is up to 5 °C cooler, 20% faster and 30% more efficient than Quick Charge 3.0 with Dual Charge+.

Quick Charge 4+ was announced on June 1, 2017. It introduces Intelligent Thermal Balancing and Advanced Safety Features to eliminate hot spots and protect against overheating and short-circuit or damage to the USB-C connector. Dual Charge++ is mandatory, while in prior versions Dual Charge was optional. Unlike Quick Charge 4, Quick Charge 4+ is fully backward compatible with Quick Charge 2.0 and 3.0 devices.

Quick Charge 5 was announced on 27 July 2020. With up to 100 W of power, on a mobile phone with a 4500 mAh battery, Qualcomm claims 50% charge in just 5 minutes. Qualcomm announced that this standard is cross-compatible with USB Power Delivery and Programmable Power Supply (USB PD PPS), and that its technology can communicate with the charger when charging double cells and double the voltage and current out. For instance, a single battery requests 8.8 V; the dual cell can then ask the PPS charger to output 17.6 volts and split it in half to the two separate batteries, providing 5.6 amps total to achieve 100 watts. The first phone with this technology was the Xiaomi Mi 10 Ultra.

Quick Charge 5+ was announced on Sep 10, 2025.

=== Quick Charge for Wireless Power ===
On February 25, 2019, Qualcomm announced Quick Charge for Wireless Power. Quick Charge for Wireless Power falls back on the Qi standard by the Wireless Power Consortium if either the charger or device is not compatible.

== Versions ==
Technology	Release date	Voltage	Maximum		New features	SoCs
Technology	Release date	Voltage	Current	Power (Note: Some mobile phones deactivate fast charging during operation, and only activate fast charging during standby mode or power-off state.)	New features	SoCs
Quick Charge 1.0	2013	Up to 6.3 V	2 A	10 W	AICL (Automatic Input Current Limit); APSD (Automatic Power Source Detection)	Snapdragon 215, 600
Quick Charge 2.0	2014 (Note: The Galaxy Note 4, released in September 2014, was already equipped with Quick Charge 2.0.)	Class A: 5 V, 9 V, 12 V; Class B: 5 V, 9 V, 12 V, 20 V	1.67 A, 2 A, or 3 A	18 W (9 V × 2 A) (Note: Because Quick Charge 3.0 power supplies are backwards-compatible with Quick Charge 2.0, Quick Charge 3.0 chargers are often able to deliver more power to Quick Charge 2.0 loads than Quick Charge 2.0 chargers, since Quick Charge 3.0 chargers can provide higher currents at the same voltages.)	HVDCP (High Voltage Dedicated Charging Port); Dual Charge (optional)	Snapdragon 200, 208, 210, 212, 400, 410, 412, 415, 425, 610, 615, 616, 653, 800, 801, 805, 808, 810
Quick Charge 3.0	2016	3.2 or 3.6 V – 20 V in 0.2 V increments. (inconsistent sources)	2.6 A, or 4.6 A	36 W (12 V × 3 A)	HVDCP+; Dual Charge+ (optional); INOV 1.0 & 2.0; Battery Saver Technologies	Snapdragon 427, 429, 430, 435, 439, 450, 460, 617, 620, 625, 626, 632, 650, 652, 653, 662, 665, 680, 820, 821
Quick Charge 3+	2020	scalable voltage with 20mV steps from Quick Charge 4	?	?	Integrated cable power capability/identification; Various safety mechanisms	Snapdragon 765, 765G
Quick Charge 4	2017	via QC: 3.6–20 V in 20 mV increments; via USB PD: 5 V, 9 V; via USB PD 3.0 PPS: 3–21 V in 20 mV increments	via QC: 2.6 A, or 4.6 A; via USB PD: 3 A	via QC: 100 W (20 V × 5 A); via USB PD: 27 W	HVDCP++; Dual Charge++ (optional); INOV 3.0; Battery Saver Technologies 2.0; USB PD compatible; Cable Quality Detection	Snapdragon 630, 636, 660, 710, 720G, 835, 845
Quick Charge 4+	2017	via QC: 3.6–20 V in 20 mV increments; via USB PD: 5 V, 9 V; via USB PD 3.0 PPS: 3–21 V in 20 mV increments	via QC: 2.6 A, or 4.6 A; via USB PD: 3 A	via QC: 100 W (20 V × 5 A); via USB PD: 27 W	Dual Charge++ (mandatory); Intelligent Thermal Balancing; Advanced Safety Features	Snapdragon 480, 480+, 4 Gen 1, 670, 675, 678, 690, 695, 6 Gen 1, 712, 730, 730G, 732G, 750G, 765, 765G, 768G, 778G, 780G, 7 Gen 1, 855, 855+/860, 865, 865+, 870
Quick Charge 5	2020	?	?	>100 W (30V+)	>100 W charging power; 100% in 15 minutes; Better thermal management (not more than 40 °C); Dual Charge	Snapdragon 888, 888+, 8 Gen 1, 8+ Gen 1, 7+ Gen 2, 8 Gen 2, 8 Gen 3, Gen 4, Gen 5
Quick Charge 5+	2025	?	?	via QC: 140 W (20 V × 7 A)	?	?

== Other charging protocols ==
=== Compatible with QC-enabled chargers ===
- USB Power Delivery (USB-PD, used by multiple brands and platforms)
- Adaptive Fast Charging (Samsung) (Note: Samsung's own 15 W Quick Charge 2.0 mobile phone chargers can produce only 5 and 9 volts (at 2 A and 1.67 A respectively), not 12 volts (at which 1.25 A is possible in some other 15 W Quick Charge 2.0 chargers).)
- Super Fast Charging (Samsung, utilize USB PD PPS)
- BoostMaster (Asus)
- Dual-Engine Fast Charging (Vivo, pre-2020 models only) – interchangeable with Dash Charge and VOOC
- Mi Turbo Charge (Xiaomi)
- TurboPower (Motorola)

=== Other proprietary protocols ===
- DART (Realme, 2020 to 2022 ) – interchangeable with SuperVOOC, Super Flash Charge, and Warp Charge
- Pump Express (MediaTek)
- Super Flash Charge (Vivo, 2020 onwards) – interchangeable with SuperVOOC, DART, and Warp Charge
- Super FlashCharge (iQOO)
- SuperCharge (Huawei)
- HyperCharge (Redmi, Black Shark and Poco)
- Ultra Charge (Tecno)
- SuperVOOC (OPPO, from 2019 to present and Realme, from 2022 to present) – interchangeable with DART, Super Flash Charge, and Warp Charge
- VOOC (OPPO, until 2019 and pre-2020 Realme models) – interchangeable with Dash Charge and Dual-Engine Fast Charging
- Warp Charge, formerly Dash Charge (OnePlus) – interchangeable with Super Flash Charge, SuperVOOC, VOOC, Dual-Engine Fast Charging, and DART
- XCharge (Infinix)
- Apple Lightning until iPhone 15
- Apple USB-C since iPhone 15; since iPhone 17, it supports USB PD AVS
- Universal Fast Charging Specification (UFCS) – Huawei, Honor, OPPO, vivo, Xiaomi, Silergy, Rockchip, Lipton Technology and Onpo Electronics
