= Battery pack =

Set of batteries or battery cells

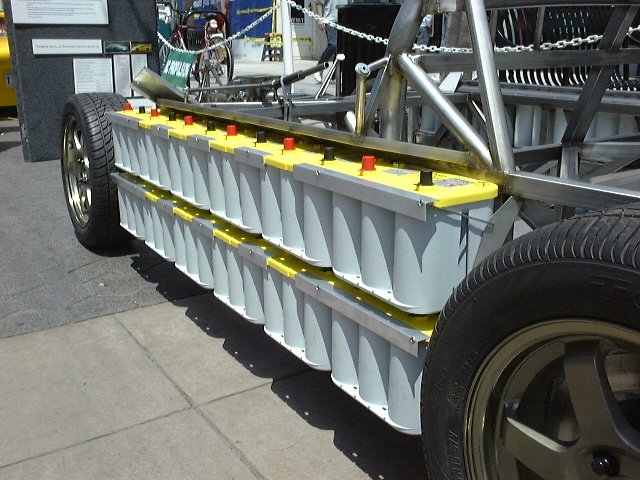
Lead-acid automobile battery pack consisting of 28 Optima Yellow Tops

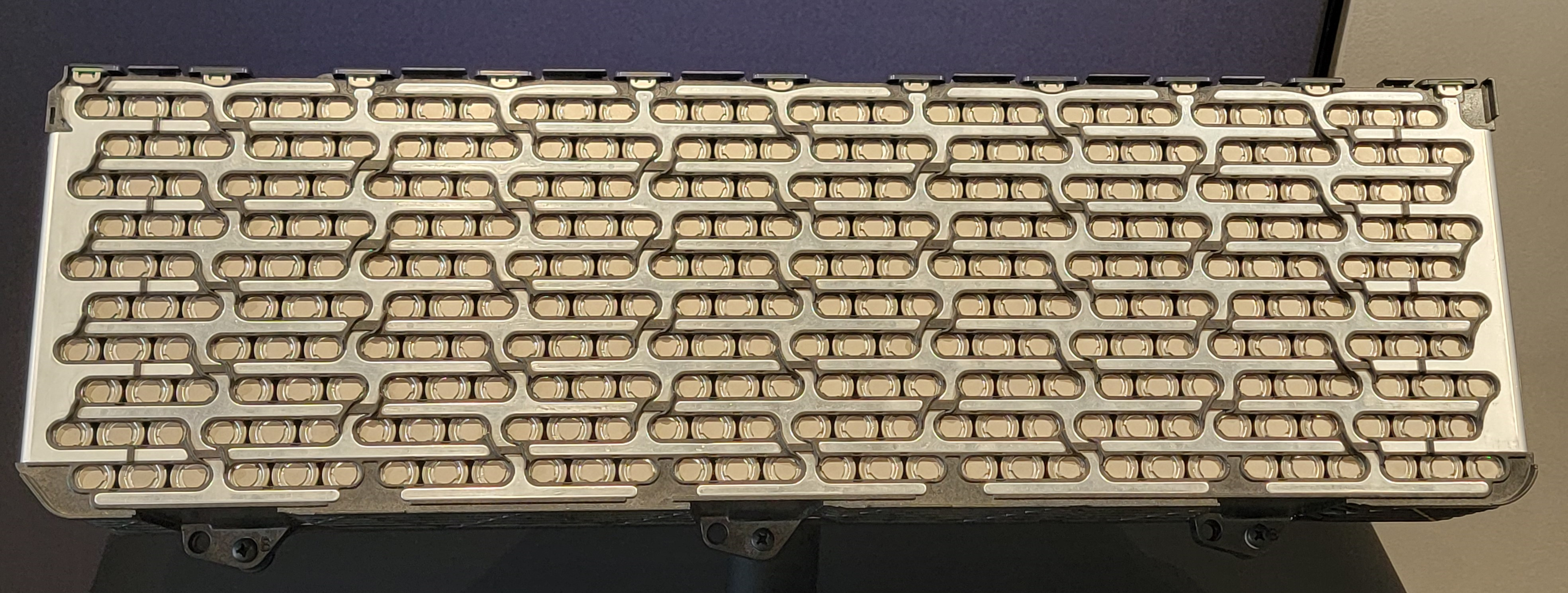
Lithium-ion battery pack for Lucid Motors

A battery pack is a set of any number of (preferably) identical batteries or individual battery cells. They may be configured in a series, parallel or a mixture of both to deliver the desired voltage and current. The term battery pack is often used in reference to cordless tools, radio-controlled hobby toys, and battery electric vehicles.

Components of battery packs include the individual batteries or cells, and the interconnects which provide electrical conductivity between them. Rechargeable battery packs often contain voltage and temperature sensors, which the battery charger uses to detect the end of charging. Interconnects are also found in batteries as they are the part which connects each cell, though batteries are most often only arranged in series strings.

When a pack contains groups of cells in parallel there are differing wiring configurations which take into consideration the electrical balance of the circuit. Battery Management System are sometimes used for balancing cells in order to keep their voltages below a maximum value during charging so as to allow the weaker batteries to become fully charged, bringing the whole pack back into balance. Active balancing can also be performed by battery balancer devices which can shuttle energy from strong cells to weaker ones in real time for better balance. A well-balanced pack lasts longer and delivers better performance.

For an inline package, cells are selected and stacked with solder in between them. The cells are pressed together and a current pulse generates heat to solder them together and to weld all connections internal to the cell.

== Calculating state of charge ==
SOC, or state of charge, is the equivalent of a fuel quantity remaining. SOC cannot be determined by a simple voltage measurement, because the terminal voltage of a battery may stay substantially constant until it is completely discharged. In some types of battery, electrolyte specific gravity may be related to state of charge but this is not measurable on typical battery pack cells, and is not related to state of charge on most battery types. Most SOC methods take into account voltage and current as well as temperature and other aspects of the discharge and charge process to in essence count up or down within a pre-defined capacity of a pack. More complex state of charge estimation systems take into account the Peukert effect which relates the capacity of the battery to the discharge rate.

== Advantages ==
An advantage of a battery pack is the ease with which it can be swapped into or out of a device. This allows multiple packs to deliver extended runtimes, freeing up the device for continued use while charging the removed pack separately.

Another advantage is the flexibility of their design and implementation, allowing the use of cheaper high-production cells or batteries to be combined into a pack for nearly any application.

At the end of product life, batteries can be removed and recycled separately, reducing the total volume of hazardous waste.

== Disadvantages ==
Packs are often simpler for end users to repair or tamper with than a sealed non-serviceable battery or cell. Though some might consider this an advantage it is important to take safety precautions when servicing a battery pack as they pose a danger as potential chemical, electrical, and fire risks.

== Power bank ==
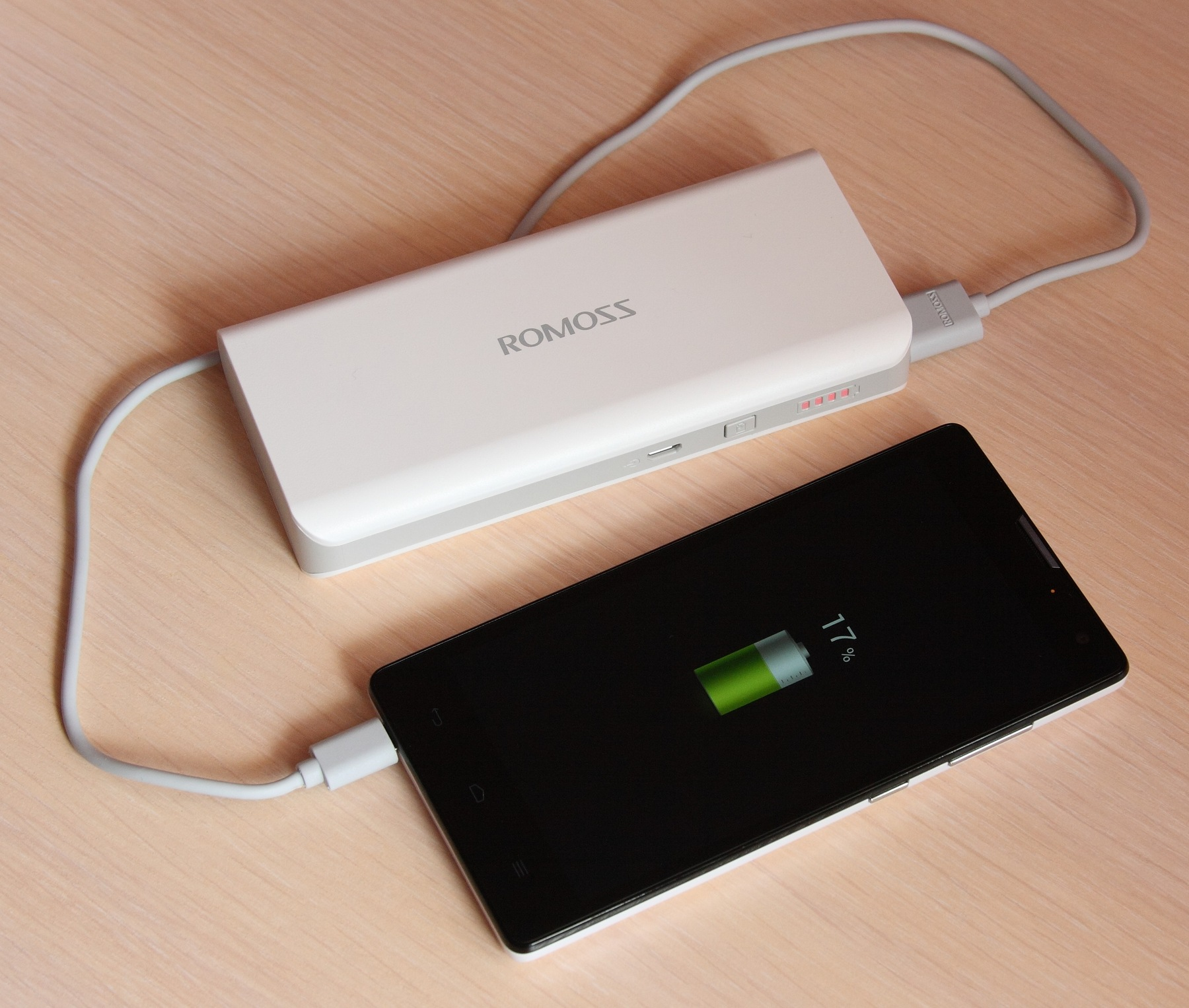
A portable power bank charging a mobile phone

A power bank is a portable device consisting of a battery, a charger to interface battery with charging power source and an output interface to provide desired output voltage. Power banks are made in various sizes and typically based on lithium-ion batteries. A power bank contains battery cells and a voltage converter circuitry. The internal DC-DC converter manages battery charging and converts the battery stack's voltage to the desired output voltage. The advertised capacity on the product in many instances is based on the capacity of the internal cells, however the theoretical mAh available to output depends on the output voltage. The conversion circuit has some energy losses, so the actual output is less than theoretical. The theoretical mAh of a 3.7 V battery power bank with 5 V output is 74% of the battery mAh rating. The RavPower RP-PB41 with advertised capacity of 26,800 mAh that was evaluated in the journal has a theoretical capacity of 19,832 mAh, although the delivered capacity was 15,682 mAh, 78% of theoretical value. Authors attributed the difference to internal resistance in battery and converter losses. The circuit board can contain additional features such as over discharge protection, automatic shut off and charge level indication LEDs. Power banks may be able to detect a connection and power on automatically. If the current load is under a model-specific threshold for a specific duration, a power bank may power down automatically.

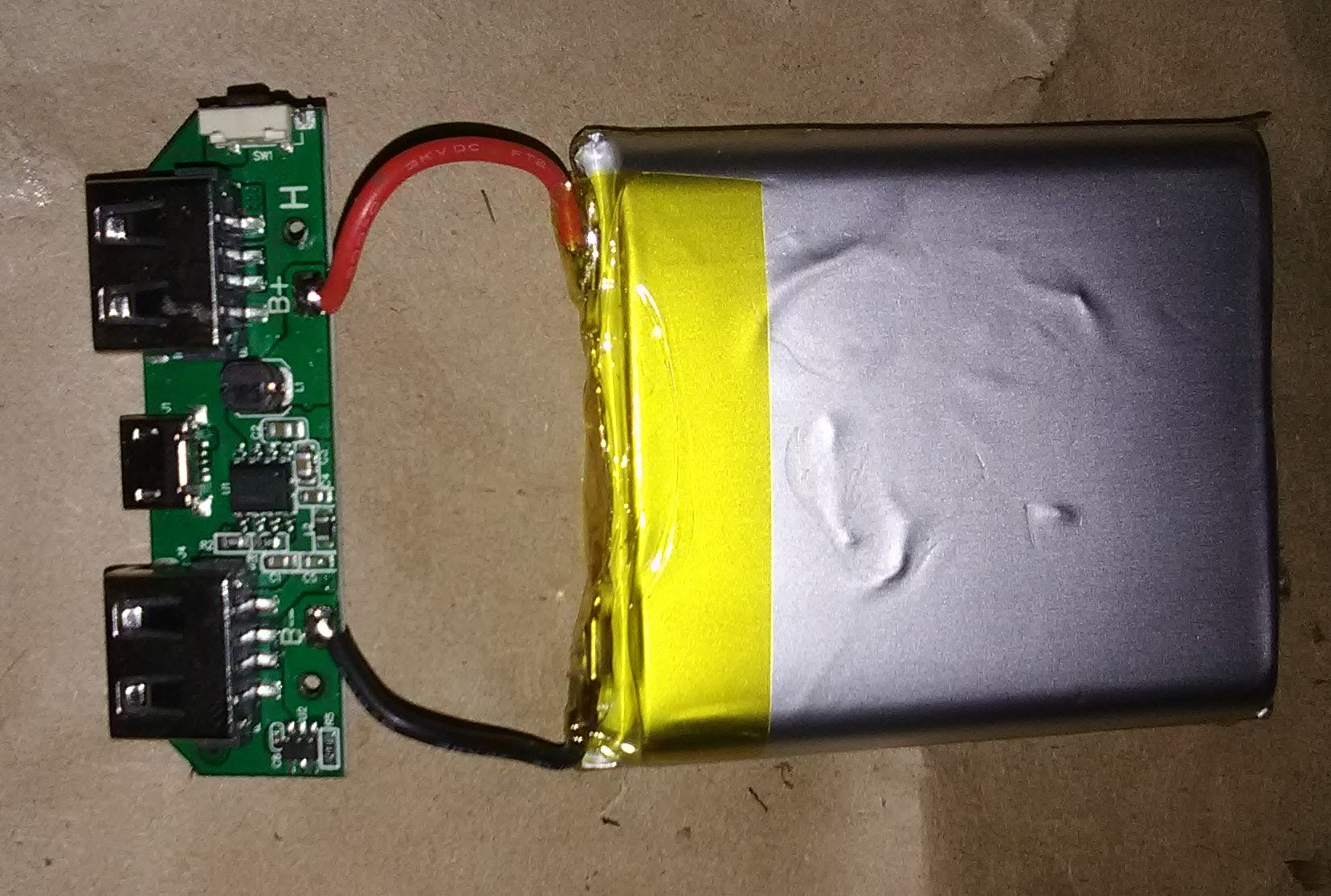
Inside of a "5,000mAh" power bank consisting of a battery and a circuit board containing the charger and the output converter.

The average power bank in 2023 transferred around 2/3, or 67% of the power bank's battery energy into the battery of the device being charged.

Some power banks are able to deliver power wirelessly, some are equipped with an LED flashlight for casual near-distance illumination when necessary, and some have a pass-through charging feature which allows providing power through their USB ports while being charged themselves simultaneously. Some larger power banks have DC connectors (or barrel connectors) for higher power demands such as laptop computers.

=== Battery cases ===
Battery cases are small power banks attached to the rear side of a mobile phone like a case. Power may be delivered through the USB charging ports, or wirelessly. Battery cases also exist in the form of a camera grip accessory, as was for the Nokia Lumia 1020. For mobile phones with removable rear cover, extended batteries exist. These are larger internal batteries attached with a dedicated, more spacious rear cover replacing the default one. A disadvantage is incompatibility with other phone cases while attached.

Prong cases included fold-out prongs integrated into the case itself.

=== Rental/exchange ===
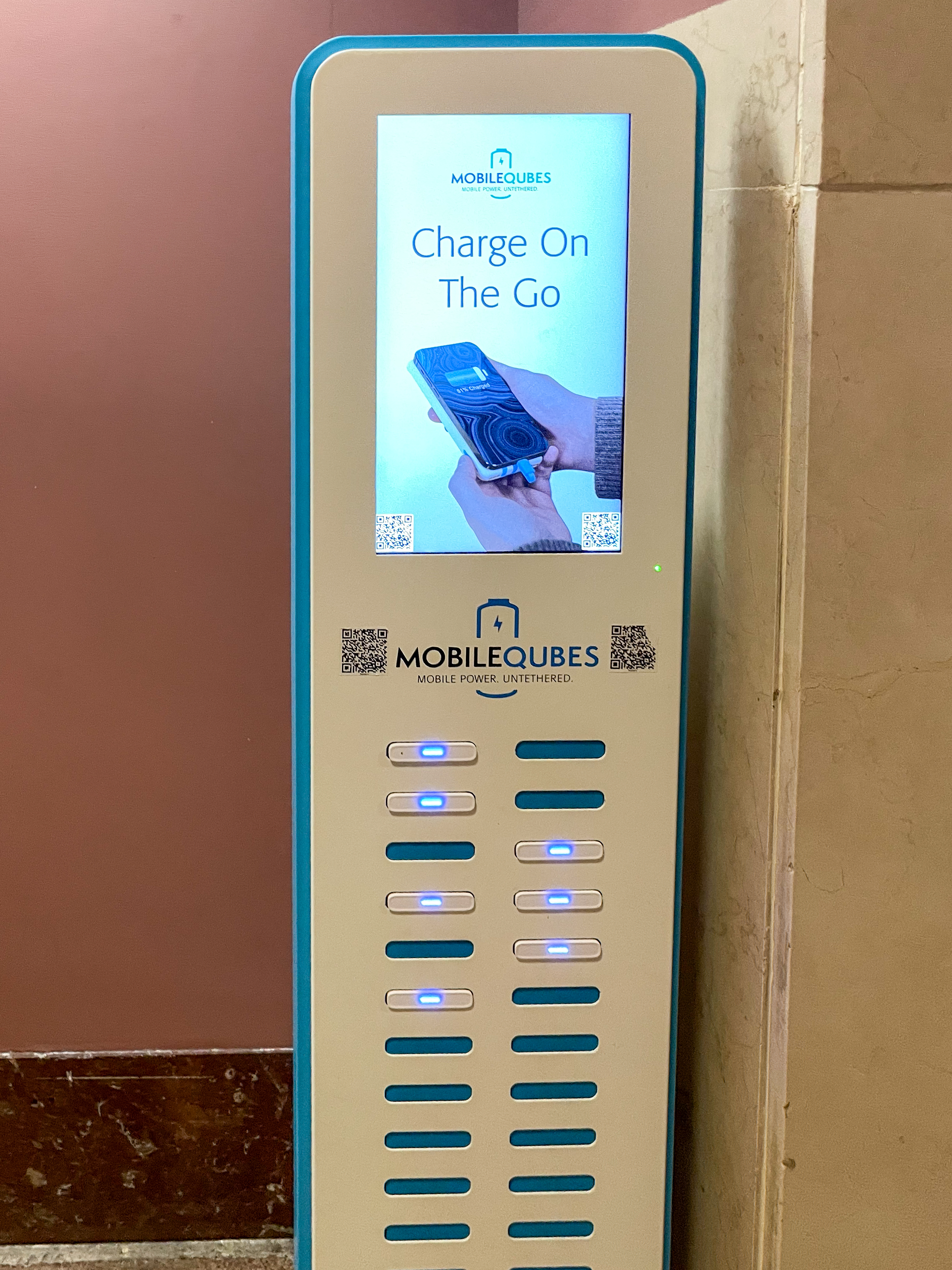
A power bank rental vending machine in United States in 2024

In some parts of the world, there are kiosk based power bank rental or subscription services. Customers pay for the use of power bank for a specified period of time and return the depleted power bank to the kiosk. In one case with a brand called FuelRod, it was sold at an elevated price at various amusement parks with the understanding that they get a perk of free exchange at participating locations. FuelRod moved to discontinue the free exchange in 2019 and resulted in a class-action lawsuit reaching a settlement that early adopters would be grandfathered to free exchange privileges.

=== Air travel restrictions ===
Per US Federal Aviation Administration regulations, power banks in the United States are not allowed in checked-in luggage. Power banks up to 100 Wh are allowed as carry-on and those 101 Wh to 160 Wh are allowed with airline approval.

After Air Busan Flight 391 in Korea, concerns about power banks on flights arose, and new regulations of power banks were issued. The Korean government issued a ban on using power banks on Korean flights. In March 2025, Civil Aviation Authority of Malaysia issued a directive to advise passengers storing power banks on their person, and avoid in overhead bins. In February 2025, Eva Air announced their ban on using power banks on flights. AirAsia, China Airlines, Starlux Airlines, Singapore Airlines, and Thai Airways issued similar bans later. In June, China's Civil Aviation Administration banned passengers from carrying power banks that lack China Compulsory Certification on domestic flights. The International Civil Aviation Organization published the new guidelines for power banks on 27 March 2026, which limited to two per passenger, and recharging during the flights is prohibited.

== See also ==
- Battery balancer
- Battery charger
- Battery management system
- Battery monitoring
- Battery regulator
- List of battery types
- Smart battery
