= Prong (company) =

- Industry: Private company
- Founded: 2011
- Defunct: 2017
- Fate: Closed
- Headquarters: New York City, United States
- Products: PocketPlug smartphone charging case
- Website: www.prong.com

Prong was an iPhone battery case company based in New York City, primarily manufacturing accessories for electronic devices. Its first product was the PocketPlug, a smartphone case that had the prongs to connect directly to a power socket without needing a charging cable.

== History ==
Prong was founded in 2011 with the production of the PocketPlug. The company later introduced the Prong PWR Case, a removable battery case with integrated prongs.

Prong introduced the PocketPlug, at the Consumer Electronics Show in January 2013. It was first reviewed by The Washington Post, citing that they enjoyed the product, although adding the critique that a battery pack was needed and the product had limited usability during charging. The New York Times gave a similar review. CNet felt that the phone was lacking an external battery.

Prong ceased trading in 2017.
