= Charge cycle =

Charging and discharging a battery

A charge cycle is the process of charging a rechargeable battery and discharging it as required into a load. The term is typically used to specify a battery's expected life, as the number of charge cycles affects life more than the mere passage of time. Discharging the battery fully before recharging may be called "deep discharge"; partially discharging then recharging may be called "shallow discharge".

A "charge cycle" is not a unit of time; the length of time spent charging or discharging does not affect the number of charge cycles. Each battery is affected differently by charge cycles.

In general, number of cycles for a rechargeable battery (the cycle life) indicates how many times it can undergo the process of complete charging and discharging until failure or starting to lose capacity.

Apple Inc. clarifies that a charge cycle means using all the battery's capacity, but not necessarily by discharging it from 100% to 0%: "You complete one charge cycle when you’ve used (discharged) an amount that equals 100% of your battery’s capacity — but not necessarily all from one charge. For instance, you might use 75% of your battery’s capacity one day, then recharge it fully overnight. If you use 25% the next day, you will have discharged a total of 100%, and the two days will add up to one charge cycle."

== See also ==
- Deep-cycle battery
