= AC'97 =

Personal computer audio codec

AC'97 (Audio Codec '97; also MC'97 for Modem Codec '97) is an audio codec standard developed by Intel Architecture Labs and various codec manufacturers in 1997. The standard was used in motherboards, modems, and sound cards.

The specification covers two types of components, and the AC-Link digital interface between them:

1. an AC'97 digital controller (DC97), which is typically built into the southbridge of the chipset, and
2. an AC'97 audio and/or modem codec, available from several vendors, which contains the analog components of the architecture.
3. an optional AC'97 audio DSP for sound effects.

AC'97 defines a high-quality, 16- or 24-bit audio architecture with 5.1 surround sound support for the PC. AC'97 supports up to 96 kHz sampling rate at 24-bit stereo resolution, and up to 48 kHz sampling rate at 24-bit resolution for 5.1 multichannel recording and playback.

Integrated audio is implemented with the AC'97 Codec on the motherboard, a communications and networking riser card, or an audio/modem riser card.

The first shipping system was in the Cyrix MediaGX, in 1997. Intel started shipping the initial I/O Controller Hub support in 1999, and it was not until public shaming in 2000, that most PC OEMs started shipping AC'97 audio as the default.

In 2004, Intel released Intel High Definition Audio (HD Audio) which is a successor that is not backward compatible with AC'97. HD Audio has the capability to define up to 15 output channels, but in practice most motherboards provide no more than 8 channels (7.1 surround sound).

== Revisions ==
AC'97 has had several revisions:

- AC'97 1.x compliant indicates fixed 48 kHz sampling rate operation (non-extended feature set)
- AC'97 2.1 compliant indicates extended audio feature set (optional variable rate, multichannel, etc.)
- AC'97 2.2 compliant indicates extended audio, enhanced riser audio support, and optional Sony/Philips Digital Interface Format
- AC'97 2.3 compliant indicates extended configuration information and optional jack sensing support

AC'97 revision 2.3 enables Plug and Play for the end user. This revision provides means for the audio codec to supply parametric data about its analog interface much like Intel High Definition Audio.

== AC-Link ==
The AC-Link is a digital link that connects the DC97 (the controller) with the audio codecs. It is composed of five wires: the 12.288 MHz clock, a 48 kHz sync signal, a reset signal, and two data wires which carry the actual audio data: sdata_out and sdata_in. The first four are outputs from the controller, while sdata_in carries input from the codec. The link carries a bidirectional serial data stream at a fixed bitrate (12.288 Mbit/s) between the controller and one or more codecs.

Each 12.288 Mbit/s stream is divided into 256-bit frames (frame frequency is 48 kHz). This is therefore a time-division multiplexing scheme.

Every frame is subdivided in 13 slots. The first (slot 0) is 16 bits long and contains validity flags for the remaining slots, while the remaining 240 bits are divided in twelve 20-bit slots (slots 1–12), used as data slots.

Slots 1, 2 and 12 are used for non-audio data, while slots 3–11 carry up to nine channels of raw pulse-code modulation audio signals. Normally, six channels are used for 5.1 surround sound, and three channels are available for modem use. However, slots can be combined to provide a 96 kHz sampling rate for the L, R and C channels.

Lower sample rates (such as 44.1 kHz) are implemented using a handshake protocol between the controller and codec which skips data during certain frames. (This capability depends on the codec. Alternatively, sample rate conversion could be performed in the DC97 (controller) or in the software driver.)

== Codec chips ==
Codec chips have an AC'97 interface on one side and analog audio interface on the other. They are usually small square chips with 48 pins (48-pin QFP package). They are D/A and A/D or only D/A.

- Analog Devices AD1819B, AD1881A, AD1885, AD1886, AD1887, AD1980, AD1981, AD1981A, AD1985. Since then, ADI have gotten out of the PC audio business, either obsoleting or selling off devices to Conexant (which is now Synaptics).
- AKM (Asahi Kasei Microsystems) AK 4540, 4543, 4544A, 4545
- Avance Logic (now Realtek) ALC201A, ALC202/A, ALC650, ALC655, ALC658, ALC101, ALC202A, ALC250, ALC850, ALC888
- Conexant Cx20468 – with a modem
- Cirrus Logic CrystalWare 4236, CrystalClear SoundFusion CS4297, CS4299
- Creative Technology
- Crystal Semiconductors CS4205, CS4202
- C-Media CMI9738, 9739, 9761, 9880
- ESS ES1988 (with a modem)
- Empia EMP202 (2 channel, 20-bit DAC and 20-bit ADC, full duplex AC'97 2.2 compatible stereo audio CODEC)
- Integrated Device Technology (IDT)
- Intersil HMP9701 (obsolete, 48 kHz fixed sample rate)
- National Semiconductor LM4550, LM49321, LM49350, LM49352
- Philips UCB 1400 (with touchscreen controller)
- Realtek ALC5610 ALC5611
- SigmaTel (now IDT) C-Major STAC 9460 (D/A only), 9461, 9462, 9463, 9200, 9202, 9250, 9251, 9220, 9221, 9223, 9750
- Silicon Labs Si3036, Si3038, Si3046, Si3048 (modem only, two part chipset consists of Si3024 or Si3025 and Si3012 or Si3014)
- TriTech Microelectronics TR28022, 28026
- Yamaha YMF 743, 752, 753
- VIA VT1612, VT1616 (VIA Six-TRAC Vinyl Audio)
- Winbond W83971
- Wolfson Microelectronics WM9701, WM9703, WM9704, WM9705 (with touchscreen), WM9707, WM9708, WM9709 (DAC only), WM9711, WM9712 (with touchscreen), WM9713 (with touchscreen), WM9714

== Front panel connector ==
Computer motherboards often provide a connector to bring microphone and headphone signals to the computer's front panel with standard color jack. Intel provides a specification for that header; the signal assignments are different for AC'97 and Intel High Definition Audio headers.

== Operating system support ==
AC'97 is supported by Windows (starting with Windows 95) and Linux. Under DOS, applications usually access the sound hardware directly instead of utilizing device drivers, and therefore most DOS applications do not support AC'97. 64-bit versions of Windows 7 require a third-party driver for AC'97 support.

== See also ==
- Inter-IC Sound (I²S)
- Audio/modem riser (AMR)
- Advanced Communications Riser (ACR)
- Communications and networking riser (CNR)
- Mobile daughter card (MDC)
- Sony/Philips Digital Interface (S/P-DIF)
- PC System Design Guide
- Sound card
