= Advanced Communications Riser =

PC motherboard expansion slot format

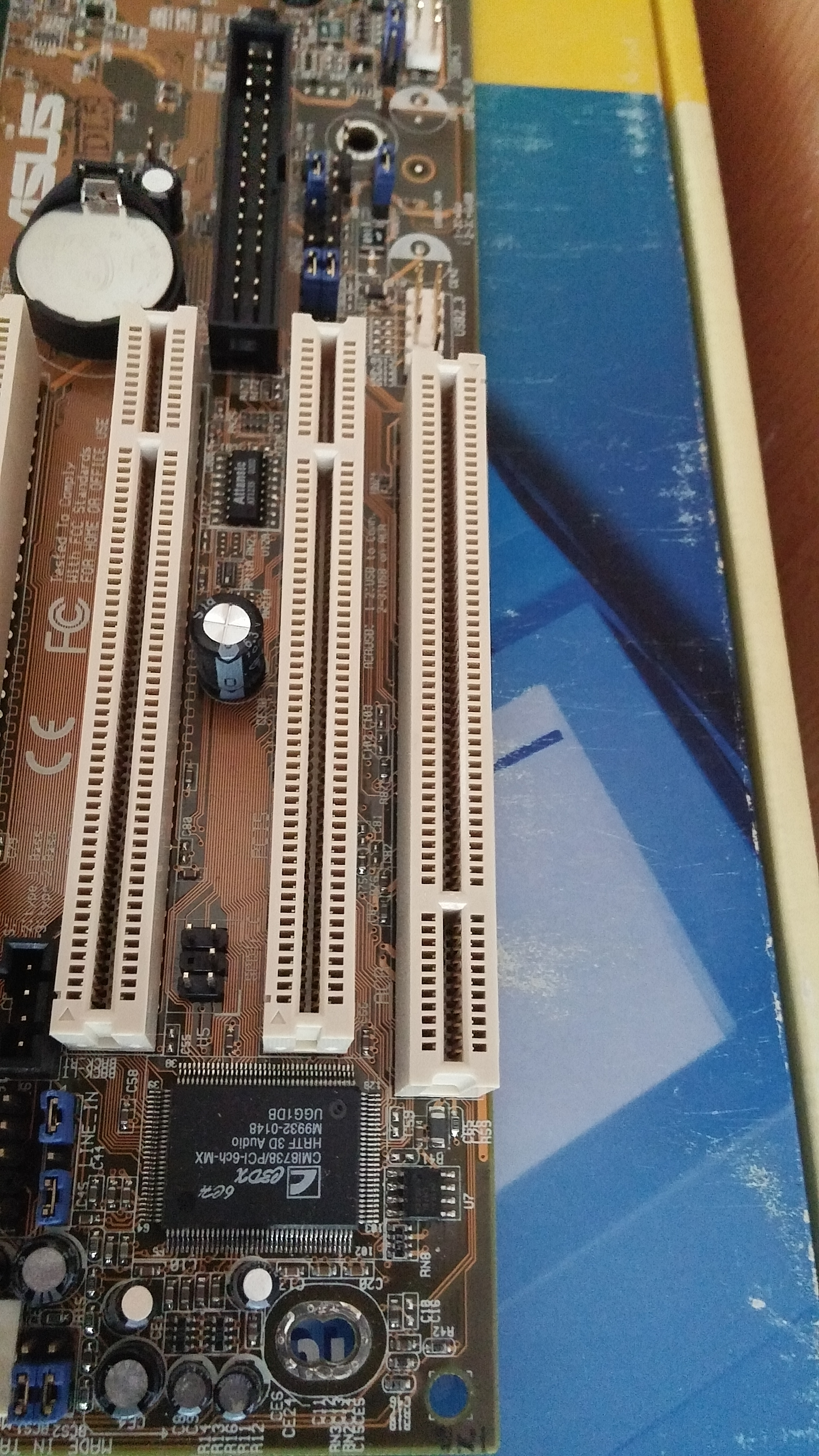
ACR expansion slot (right), on the left 2 PCI slots

The Advanced Communications Riser, or ACR, is a form factor and technical specification for PC motherboard expansion slots. It is meant as a supplement to PCI slots, a replacement for the original Audio/modem riser (AMR) slots, and a competitor and alternative to Intel's communications and networking riser (CNR) slots.

== Technology ==
The ACR specification provides a lower cost method to connect certain expansion cards to a computer, with an emphasis on audio and communications devices. Sound cards and modems are the most common devices to use the specification. ACR and other riser cards lower hardware costs by offloading much of the computing tasks of the peripheral to the CPU.

ACR uses a 120 pin PCI connector which is reversed and offset, retaining backward compatibility with 46 pin AMR cards while including support for newer technologies. It is also more cost-effective and simple for the manufacturer, since the connectors are identical to the PCI connectors already purchased in quantity. New features supported by ACR include standards for an EEPROM for storing model and vendor information, USB support, and the Integrated Packet Bus for digital subscriber line (DSL), cable modem, and wireless networking support.

== History ==
The ACR specification was created by the Advanced Communications Riser Special Interest Group (ACR SIG) in 2000 with the intent to replace the AMR specification. Because it was backwards compatible with AMR cards, and technically superior, it quickly replaced it.

ACR is rendered obsolete by discrete components mounted on the motherboard.

== See also ==
- Mobile Daughter Card (MDC), a version of ACR for mobile devices
- GeoPort, a similar standard for the Apple Macintosh
