= Chinese language card =

Type of computer expansion card

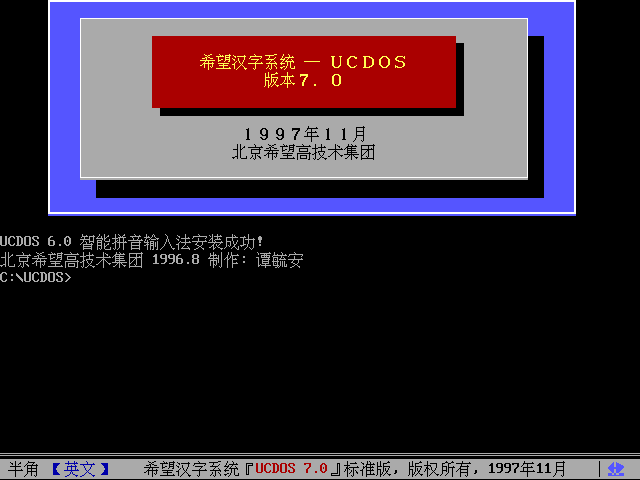
Screenshot of UCDOS 7.0

A Chinese language card or Chinese character card is a computer expansion card that improves the ability of computers to process Chinese text.

Early computers were limited in processing speed and storage capacity. If a software like CC-DOS or zh:UCDOS is being used to render Chinese characters, the Chinese font could take up to 1/3 of RAM, making it impossible to execute large programs. Moreover, Chinese rendering via software must go through the BIOS, so that the speed is as slow as dozens of characters per second.

Using a Chinese Character card could improve the computer's ability to process Chinese text. The card has a Chinese font burnt on its ROM chip, so that the font no longer takes up computer RAM. It takes internal codes and directly renders the corresponding characters onto the screen, which works much faster than software-based rendering.

== Manufacturers ==
At the beginning of the 1990s, Lenovo (Legend Group), Founder Group, Giant Corporation, and E-TEN were manufacturing Chinese Character cards.

== Decline ==
As computer hardware improved, Chinese character cards were gradually rendered obsolete by software. Currently very few computers use Chinese Character cards to handle Chinese text. After Microsoft began supporting Chinese Language in MS-DOS and Microsoft Windows, Chinese Character cards were essentially rendered obsolete.

== See also ==
- Han card
