= Communications and networking riser =

Slot found on certain PC motherboards used for specialized equipment

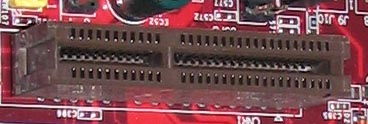
A CNR slot

Communications and networking riser (CNR) is a slot found on certain personal computer motherboards and used for specialized networking, audio, or telephony equipment. A motherboard manufacturer may choose to provide such functionality in any combination on a CNR card. Introduced by Intel in 2000, CNR slots were once commonly found on Pentium III–class motherboards, but have since been phased out in favor of on-board or embedded components.

== Technology ==
Physically, a CNR slot has two rows of 30 pins, with two possible pin configurations—Type A and Type B—each with different pin assignments. CNR Type A uses an 8-pin PHY interface, while Type B uses a 17-pin media-independent interface (MII) bus LAN interface. Both types carry USB and AC'97 signals.

As with the audio/modem riser (AMR), CNR had the cost savings potential for manufacturers by removing analog I/O components from the motherboard. This allowed the manufacturer to only certify with the Federal Communications Commission (FCC) for the CNR card, and not the entire motherboard. This resulted in a quicker production-to-market time for new motherboards, and allowed mass-production of CNR cards to be used on multiple motherboards.

The ACR slot was a competing specification developed by a group of third-party vendors. Its principal advantage over CNR was the backwards-compatible slot layout which allowed it to use both AMR and ACR cards.

== History ==
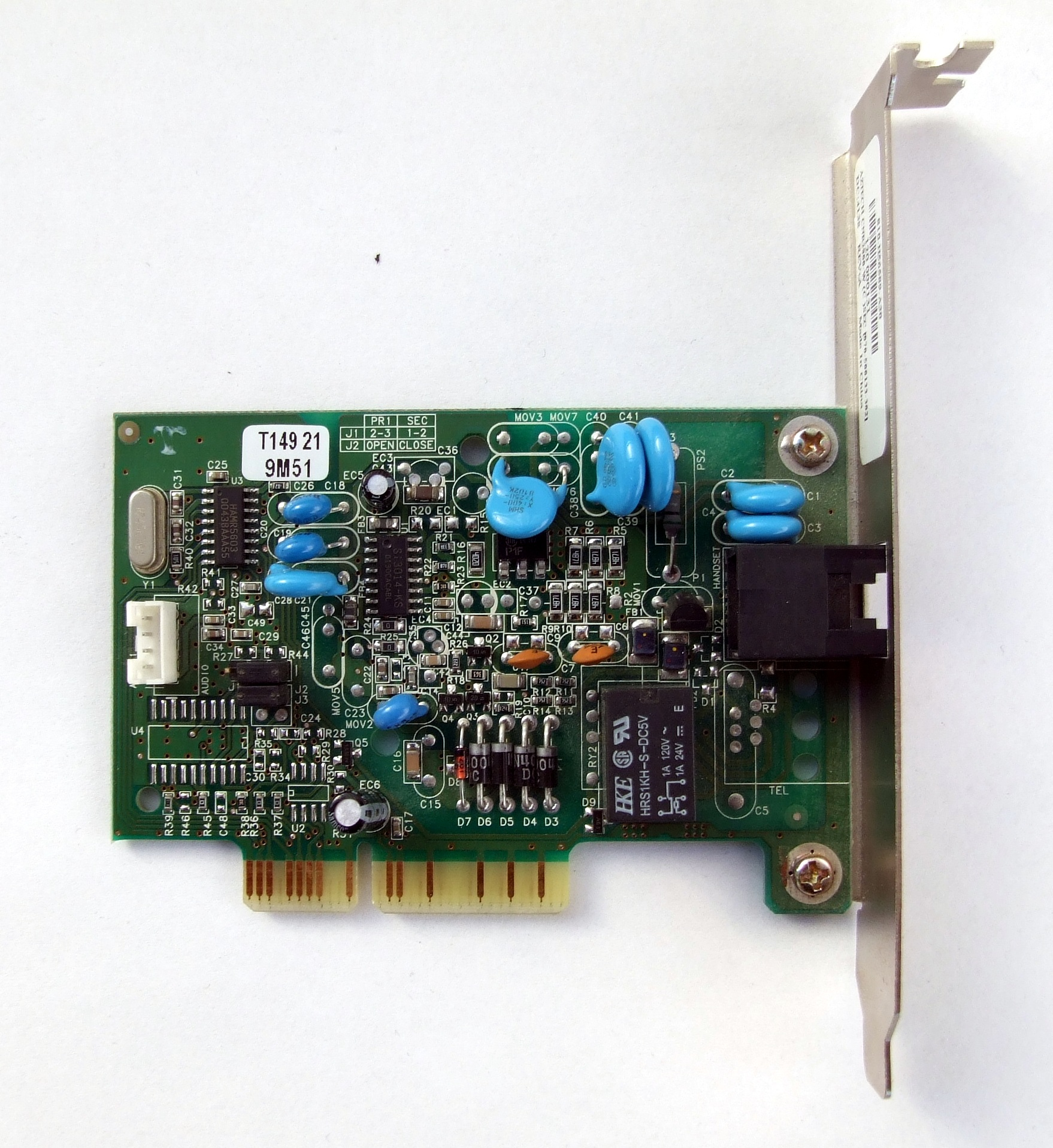
A modem for a CNR slot

Intel developed the CNR slot to replace its own AMR technology, drawing on two distinct advantages over the AMR slot it replaced. CNR was both capable of being either software based (CPU-controlled) or hardware accelerated (dedicated ASIC), and was plug-and-play compatible. On some motherboards, a CNR slot replaced the last PCI slot, but most motherboard manufacturers engineered boards which allow the CNR and last PCI slot to share the same space.

With the integration of components such as Ethernet and audio into the motherboard, the CNR slot is obsolete and not found on modern PC motherboards anymore.

== See also ==
- Mobile daughter card (MDC)
- Communications management
- GeoPort
