= Henry Lehmann =

American business executive at General Electric (1929-2000)

- Born: August 21, 1929; Leipzig, Germany
- Died: February 2, 2000 (aged 70)
- Occupation: Business executive
- Known for: Former General Manager of General Electric's military systems operation
- Spouse: Elizabeth Ann Lichtenberg (m. 1951)

Henry Lehmann (August 21, 1929 – February 2, 2000), was an American business executive who was the General Manager of General Electric's military systems operations in Syracuse, New York and a philanthropist within the American Jewish Community.

== Childhood fleeing Nazi Germany ==
Henry was born in Leipzig, Germany on August 21, 1929, the younger of two sons of comfortable German-Jewish parents Marie and Leo. Leo's mother had been born and had lived in Alsace-Lorraine. In 1937, Henry, his parents, and his elder brother René fled the Nazi regime by moving first to Nice, France, where they lived for 18 months, and then to São Paulo, Brazil. In the early spring of 1941, the family received their immigration visa to the United States and settled in New Orleans, Louisiana, home of Leo's cousin Mathile.

== Early adulthood ==
Lehmann became an Eagle Scout (Boy Scouts of America) and graduated from high school in August 1944 at the age of 14. He was given a full tuition scholarship to study at Tulane University's school of Electrical Engineering. While at Tulane, his family received word that Henry's Aunt, Hilda Landau, had been murdered at Auschwitz. Trying to rescue her from Europe had been the family's constant preoccupation since they had arrived in the United States.

Henry did well at Tulane, graduating second in his class of 16 in May 1948, at the age of 18. GE offered employment to the top three ranked graduates, and Henry accepted, beginning a 35-year career with General Electric. His first position was in Erie, PA. Henry was accepted into GE's Advanced Engineering Program, a full-time three-year in-house engineering graduate school designed in the 1930s by Robert E. Doherty to overcome the deficiencies in American engineering education, and transferred to Fort Wayne, Indiana. In August 1949, Henry moved to Schenectady for the final two years of GE's Advanced Engineering Program.

In February 1951, Henry married Elizabeth Ann Lichtenberg, daughter of Chester Lichtenberg, a senior manager of General Electric in Fort Wayne.

== Career at General Electric ==
Following his completion of the Advanced Engineering Program, Henry was assigned to its staff for two years, and then assigned to the Aeronautic and Ordnance Systems group, also in Schenectady. In 1959, the family moved to Syracuse, NY, and GE's Defense Systems Department, and in 1962 the family moved again, this time to Daytona Beach, FL and GE's Apollo Support Department. Henry was Manager of Quality Assurance. In 1966, Henry headed up the Business and Professional Operation of General Learning Corporation, a joint-venture between General Electric and Time Life in Bethesda, MD. The next year, Henry became Manager of Engineering for GE's Heavy Military Electronics Department in Syracuse, NY, managing a staff of about 2,000 persons for General Manager Thomas I. Paganelli. The group developed the Marine Corps TPS-59, the Air Force FPS-117, and the Air Force MITRE radars. Henry subsequently became Manager of Manufacturing and then General Manager of a team of about 5,000. Henry retired from General Electric at the end of 1983.

Henry was CEO of GreenSpring Computers in Redwood City, CA from 1989 through 1995, when it was acquired by SBS Technologies, now Abaco Systems.

== Philanthropy ==
Henry was a lay leader of the United Jewish Appeal in Daytona Beach, Florida, and later of the Jewish Federation and the United Way of America in Syracuse, NY. He was a board member and treasurer of Syracuse's inner-city Southwest Area Day Care Center, and led the development project for their facility. He served on Syracuse's Planned Parenthood board. Henry was a founder and board member of Syracuse's Jewish congregation Young Israel - Shaarei Torah, and an early board member and treasurer of Palo Alto, California's congregation Emek Beracha. He was a founding board member and first treasurer of the Mid-Peninsula Jewish Community Day School in Palo Alto, CA (presently Gideon Hausner Jewish Day School), and board member of Yeshivat Rambam in Baltimore, MD.

Henry was also a major financial contributor to the Krieger Schechter (Jewish) Day School, the Beth Tfiloh Day School, Congregation Shomrei Emunah, Tulane University, The Syracuse Hebrew Day School, Yeshivat Sha'alvim, Gideon Hausner Jewish Day School, and Gann Academy.
