= CRUVI FPGA card =

Daughter card standard specifically tailored to the needs of FPGAs

The CRUVI FPGA Card is a daughter card standard of Standardization Group for Embedded Technologies e.V. (SGET) specifically tailored to the needs of FPGAs.

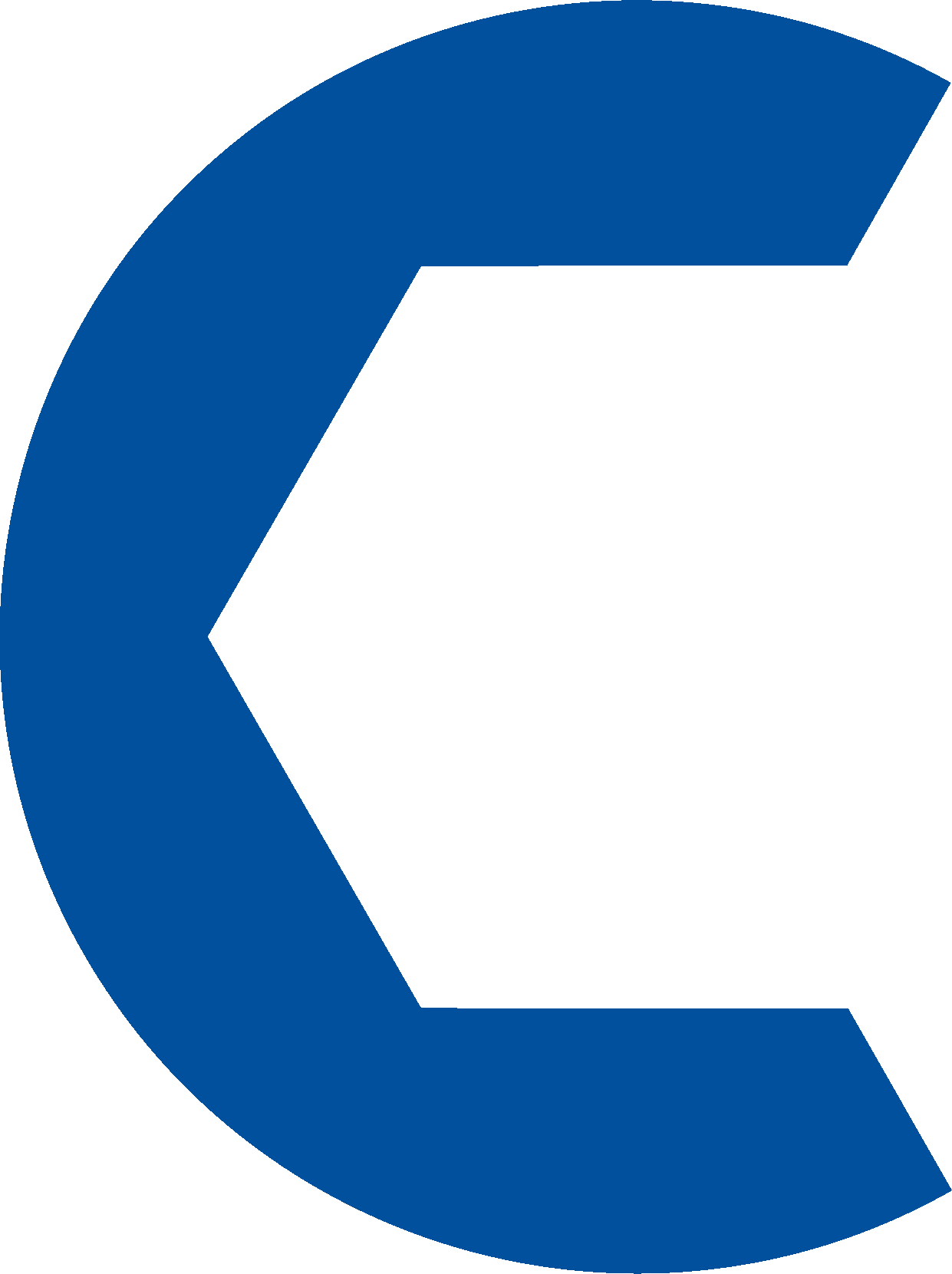
CRUVI FPGA Card Logo

== Background ==
The expansion bus interface is designed to create an open ecosystem of function modules for high-performance peripheral connectivity. Its main focus is on supporting FPGA and FPGA SoC devices from all major manufacturers like Altera, Lattice, Microchip and Xilinx.

The word "CRUVI" is a combination of the Estonian word "KRUVI" for screw and the letter "C", which refers to the half of the hexagonal screw head. In this case, the "K" was replaced with "C" to emphasize the reference to the screw head.

== Overview ==
It can be used to build high performance prototypes, for system integration and testing to build complex systems from smaller building blocks to iterate quickly and reduce cost. Create custom test systems for production functional testing.

The carrier module supplies the power supply, the input/output voltage and controls the functions of the peripheral modules.

The CRUVI open standard coexists between low speed, low pin-count like Pmod Interface devices and high-performance, high pin-count (HPC), 400 I/O FPGA Mezzanine Card (FMC) peripherals.

Three board-to-board connectors are specified: CRUVI-LS (Low Speed), CRUVI-HS (High Speed) and CRUVI-GT (Gigabit Transceiver) PCIe Gen 5.0 capable.

Bridging adapter exists to convert signals from Pmod to CRUVI-LS (CR00025), from FMC to CRUVI-HS (CR00101, CR00111) and FMC to CRUVI-GT (CR00112).

== History of CRUVI specification ==
International contributors to define the open source CRUVI specification are Trenz Electronic GmbH, Arrow Electronics, Samtec, Flinders University, Synaptic Laboratories Ltd, Symbiotic EDA and MicroFPGA UG.

History of CRUVI open source specification - FREE to use Apache License 2.0
Year	Version	Notes	Refs
2021	1.0.7 -alpha	first release	
2024	2.0.1 -alpha	new: CRUVI-GT (Gigabit Transceiver)	

The Standardization Group for Embedded Technologies e.V. (SGET) launches its call for participation to establish a new Standard Development Team (SDT) for the FPGA Peripheral Module standard with the working title sCRUVI. The founding meeting of the Standard Development Team (SDT.07) for FPGA Peripheral Modules was on May 6th 2025. This initiative aims to set a groundbreaking standard for peripheral modules used in FPGA and FPGA-SoC-based systems.

Other open standards for embedded hardware and software from SGET are Smart Mobility Architecture (SMARC) (SDT.01), Qseven (SDT.02), embedded NUC (SDT.03), Universal IoT Connector UIC (SDT.04) OPen Standard Module OSM (SDT.05) and Open Harmonzed FPGA Module oHFM (SDT.06).

== Structure and description of the carrier modules ==
Single, double or triple width modules are allowed and they have more mounting holes.

A triple size of space on carrier board is 67.72 x 57.5 mm² (2.66535 x 2.26378 inch²). There are 3 slots. The mounting holes (1 to 6) for M2 screws are 2.2 mm (0.0866 inch) diameter and need SMD spacer for mechanically fixing. The CR99201 PCB template has LS and HS connectors named: AX, BY and CZ. The CR99500 PCB template has LS, HS and GT connectors.

triple maximum size carrier board

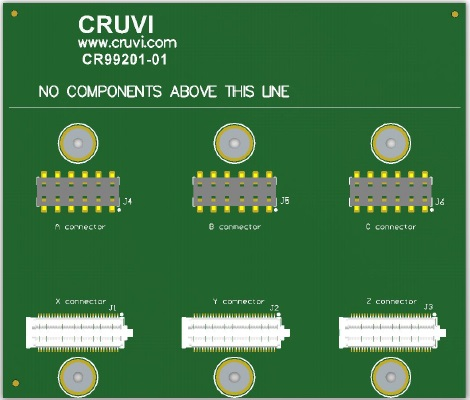

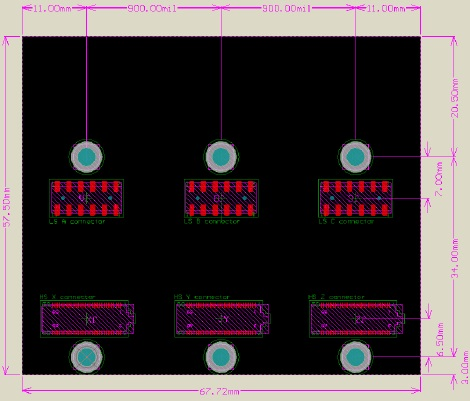

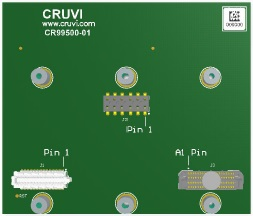

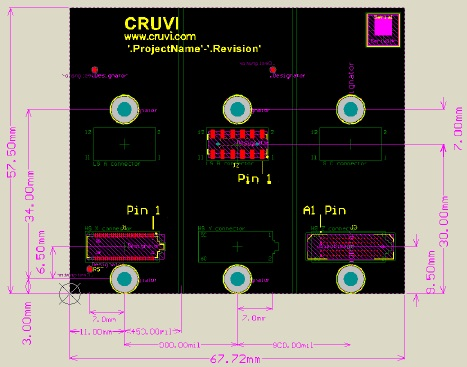

It is recommended for all FPGA host boards with CRUVI slots provide LiteX platform support files.

== Structure and description of the peripheral modules ==
There are different single peripheral module possible, flexible and scalable by size LS, HS and GT connectors. Mounting holes are for M2 screws 2.2 mm (0.0866 inch) diameter.

== CRUVI connector specification ==
specification of connectors
	LS Low Speed	HS High Speed	GT Gigabit Transceiver
Carrier side connector	CLT-106-02-F-D-A-K	SS4-30-3.50-L-D-K	ADF6-20-03.5-L-4-2
3D STEP Model			
Peripheral side connector	TMMH-106-04-F-DV-A-M	ST4-30-1.50-L-D-P	ADM6-20-01.5-L-4-2
3D STEP Model			
Pin no	12 (6 per row)	60 (30 per row)	80 (20 per row)
pitch [mm] / [inch]	2 / 0.787	0.4 / 0.016	0.635 / 0.025
stacked height [mm] / [inch]	4.78 to 5.29 /0.188 to 0.208	5 / 0.197	
speed rating [GHz] / [Gbps]	5.5 / 11	13.5 / 27 (single ended) 15.5 / 31 (differential)	32
Single ended I/O pins (VCCIO)	8	37 (28 adj.) + (9 fixed 3.3V)	8 + I2C
max. differential I/O	no	max. 12 LVDS	max. 4 lanes + REFCLK
Power Supply	adjustable, 3.3V, 5V		
Current rating per pin [A]	4.1 (2-pin powered)	1.6 (2-pin powered)	1.34 (4-pin powered)
max. Temperatur range [°C]	-55 to 125		

== peripheral board specification ==
There are different single peripheral module possible, flexible and scalable by size LS, HS and GT connectors. Mounting holes are for M2 screws 2.2 mm (0.0866 inch) diameter.

It is recommended to have EEPROM with I2C for identification of peripheral module with a specific address number.

CRUVI peripheral boards
L x H [mm²] / [inch²]	speed	PCB template	Note
14 x 14 / 0.55 x 0.55	LS	CR99001	identification EEPROM is included; this template is useful for I2C, I3C, SPI sensor, I2S PDM MEMS microphones, programmable oscillator, ADC, DAC or SPI (QSPI) Flash memory device in BGA24 or SO-8 package.
14 x 14 / 0.55 x 0.55	LS	CR99002	same as CR99001 with added u.Fl connectors for I/O
22 x 32 / 0.87 x 1.2598	LS	CR99003	maximum size one-wide half-length, identification EEPROM is included
18 x 32 / 0.71 x 1.26	LS	CR99004	This template is useful to convert into Pmod compatible connector (CR00005).
22 x 30 / 0.87 x 1.18	LS	CR99005	is half-length LS module with two SMA connectors
18 x 20 / 0.71 x 0.79	HS	CR99101	minimal size HS Module; good for HyperRAM or HyperFlash (CR00041), eMMC (CR00049) or loopback adapter for CRUVI-HS (CR00091)
22 x 57.5 / 0.87 x 2.26	HS	CR99102	maximum sized single-width HS module; good for signal test adapter to probed with scope or logic analyzer (CR00026), for high speed interfaces like USB-C, HDMI (CR00240), MIPI CSI/DSI, SDIO, xGMII Ethernet (CR0020x) and LVDS ADC (1 to 4 data lane)
	GT	CR99103	coming soon, good for HDMI output (CR00240), JESD204B ADC (CR00401), loopback adapter for CRUVI-GT (CR00092)

== LS Low Speed, HS High Speed and GT Gigabit Transceiver connector ==
CRUVI connector specification
Connector	LS Low Speed	HS High Speed	GT Gigabit Transceiver
Carrier side connector	CLT-106-02-F-D-A-K	SS4-30-3.50-L-D-K	ADF6-20-03.5-L-4-2
3D STEP Model			
Peripheral side connector	TMMH-106-04-F-DV-A-M	ST4-30-1.50-L-D-P	ADM6-20-01.5-L-4-2
3D STEP Model			
Pin no	12 (6 per row)	60 (30 per row)	80 (20 per row)
pitch [mm] / [inch]	2 / 0.787	0.4 / 0.016	0.635 / 0.025
stacked height [mm] / [inch]	4.78 to 5.29 /0.188 to 0.208	5 / 0.197	
speed rating [GHz] / [Gbps]	5.5 / 11	13.5 / 27 (single ended) 15.5 / 31 (differential)	32
Single ended I/O pins (VCCIO)	8	37 (28 adj.) + (9 fixed 3.3V)	8 + I2C
max. differential I/O	no	max. 12 LVDS	max. 4 lanes + REFCLK
Power Supply	adj., 3.3V, 5V		
Current rating per pin [A]	4.1 (2-pin powered)	1.6 (2-pin powered)	1.34 (4-pin powered)
max. Temperatur range [°C]	-55 to 125		

== CRUVI-LS pinout and signal description ==
CRUVI-LS pinout and signal description
Pin	Primary	Signal	Pin	Primary	Signal
1	SDA	I2C(SDA), SMBUS(SDA)	7	D1	UART(RXD1), SD(D1), SPI(MISO), QSPI(D1), JTAG(TDI)
2	SCL	I2C(SCL), SMBUS(SCL)	8	CLK	UART(RTS), SD(CLK), SPI(CLK), QSPI(CLK), JTAG(TCK)
3	D3	UART(RST), SD(TXD0), QSPI(D3), JTAG(nRST)	9	D0	UART(TXD1), SD(D0), SPI(MOSI), QSPI(D0) JTAG(TDO)
4	SEL	UART(CTS), SD(CMD), SPI(SEL), QSPI(SEL), JTAG(TMS)	10	VCC	Power 3.3V
5	D2	SMBUS(INT), UART(RXD0), SD(D2), QSPI(D2), JTAG(RFU)	11	RFU	tbd
6	GND	Ground	12	VBUS	Power 5V

== CRUVI-HS pinout and signal description ==
CRUVI-HS signal description
Pin	Primary Function	Note	Pin	Primary Function	Note	Pin	Primary Function	Note	Pin	Primary Function	Note
1	RFU1		16	A0_N	Transceiver I/O	31	GND	Ground	46	A5_N	Transceiver I/O
2	HSIO		17	B0_N	Transceiver I/O	32	A3_P		47	B5_N	Transceiver I/O
3	ALERT/IRQ		18	GND	Ground	33	B3_P	Transceiver I/O	48	GND	Ground
4	VCC	3,3V	19	GND	Ground	34	A3_N		49	GND	Ground
5	SDA		20	A1_P	Transceiver I/O	35	B3_N	Transceiver I/O	50	RFU2_P	
6	HSO		21	B1_P	Transceiver I/O	36	VADJ	1.2 to 3.3V	51	DI/TDI	JTAG, SPI(MISO)
7	SCL		22	A1_N	Transceiver I/O	37	GND	Ground	52	RFU2_N	
8	HSRST		23	B1_N	Transceiver I/O	38	A4_P	Transceiver I/O	53	DO/TDO	JTAG, SPI(MOSI)
9	VCC	3.3V	24	GND	Ground	39	B4_P	Transceiver I/O	54	GND	Ground
10	HSI		25	GND	Ground	40	A4_N	Transceiver I/O	55	SEL/TMS	JTAG, SPI(SEL)
11	REFCLK		26	A2_P		41	B4_N	Transceiver I/O	56	RFU_P	
12	GND	Ground	27	B2_P	Transceiver I/O	42	GND	Ground	57	MODE	JTAG EN
13	GND	Ground	28	A2_N		43	GND	Ground	58	RFU_N	
14	A0_P	Transceiver I/O	29	B2_N	Transceiver I/O	44	A5_P	Transceiver I/O	59	SCK/TCK	JTAG, SPI(CLK)
15	B0_P	Transceiver I/O	30	GND	Ground	45	B5_P	Transceiver I/O	60	VBUS	5V

== CRUVI-GT pinout and signal description ==
CRUVI-GT Gigabit Transceiver pinout and signal description
Pin	Primary Function	Note	Pin	Primary Function	Note	Pin	Primary Function	Note	Pin	Primary Function	Note
A1	GND	Ground	B1	TCK	JTAG	C1	TDI	JTAG	D1	GND	Ground
A2	TX3_N		B2	TMS	JTAG	C2	TDO	JTAG	D2	RX3_N	
A3	TX3_P		B3			C3			D3	RX3_P	
A4	GND	Ground	B4			C4			D4	GND	Ground
A5	TX2_N		B5			C5			D5	RX2_N	
A6	TX2_P		B6			C6	D1_N		D6	RX2_P	
A7	GND	Ground	B7			C7	D1_P		D7	GND	Ground
A8			B8			C8			D8	CLK0_N	CLK
A9			B9			C9			D9	CLK0_P	CLK
A10			B10	VADJ	1.2 to 3.3V	C10	VCC_5V	5V	D10	GND	Ground
A11			B11	VCC_3.3V	3.3V	C11	VCC_12V	12V	D11	GND	Ground
A12			B12			C12			D12	GBTCLK0_N	CLK
A13			B13			C13			D13	GBTCLK0_P	CLK
A14	GND	Ground	B14			C14	D0_N		D14	GND	Ground
A15	TX1_N		B15			C15	D0_P		D15	RX1_N	
A16	TX1_P		B16	S4_LS	AUX IO	C16	S7_LS	AUX IO	D16	RX1_P	
A17	GND	Ground	B17	S5_LS	AUX IO	C17	S6_LS	AUX IO	D17	GND	Ground
A18	TX0_N		B18	S0_LS	AUX IO	C18	S3_LS	AUX IO	D18	RX0_N	
A19	TX0_P		B19	S1_LS	AUX IO	C19	S2_LS	AUX IO	D19	RX0_P	
A20	GND	Ground	B20	SDA_LS	SMBus	C20	SCL_LS	SMBUs	D20	GND	Ground
