= Pmod Interface =

Microcontroller peripheral interface

Pmod interface (peripheral module interface) is an open standard defined by Digilent in the Pmod Interface Specification for connecting peripheral modules to FPGA and microcontroller development boards using 12 (8 I/O, 2 VCC, 2 GND) pins. Pmod or Pmods may also refer to modules compatible with the Pmod interface.

== Overview ==
Pmods are available from simple push buttons to more complex modules with network interfaces, analog to digital converters or liquid-crystal displays. These modules can be used with a variety of FPGA or microcontroller development boards from different vendors. The Pmod interface is designed so Pmods can be quickly connected to host boards for prototyping or evaluation purposes without soldering, but Pmods aren't quite plug and play since software and configuration is required.

Pmods come with a standard 6-pin interface of 4 signals, one ground and one power pin. Double and quad Pmods also exist. These duplicate the standard interface to allow more signals to pass through to the module.

Pmods can use either SPI, I^{2}C or UART protocol. With I^{2}C it is possible to use a 4-pin connector. Alternatively the pins 1 to 4 can be used as simple digital I/O pins.

== Pinouts ==
Pmod type pinouts
type	1 (7)	2 (8)	3 (9)	4 (10)	5 (11)	6 (12)
Type 1 (GPIO)	GPIO1	GPIO2/PWM	GPIO3	GPIO4	GND	Vcc
Type 1A (extended GPIO)	GPIO1; GPIO5	GPIO2/PWM; GPIO6/PWM	GPIO3; GPIO7	GPIO4; GPIO8	GND; GND	Vcc; Vcc
Type 2 (SPI)	CS	MOSI	MISO	SCK	GND	Vcc
Type 2A (extended SPI)	CS1; GPIO/INT	MOSI; GPIO/RESET	MISO; GPIO/CS2	SCK; GPIO/CS3	GND; GND	Vcc; Vcc
Type 3 (UART)	CTS/GPIO	TxD	RxD	RTS/GPIO	GND	Vcc
Type 3A (extended UART)	CTS/GPIO; GPIO/INT	TxD; GPIO/RESET	RxD; GPIO	RTS/GPIO; GPIO	GND; GND	Vcc; Vcc
Type 4 (H-bridge)	DIR	EN	SenseA	SenseB	GND	Vcc
Type 5 (dual H-bridge)	DIR1	EN1	DIR2	EN2	GND	Vcc
Type 5A (extended dual H-bridge)	DIR1; DIR2	EN1; EN2	Sense1A; Sense2A	Sense1B; Sense2B	GND; GND	Vcc; Vcc
Type 6 (I2C)	nc/INT	nc/RESET	SCL	SDA	GND	Vcc
Type 6A (extended I2C)	nc/INT; GPIO	nc/RESET; GPIO	SCL; GPIO	SDA; GPIO	GND; GND	Vcc; Vcc
Type 7 (I2S)	LRCLK; GPIO	DACdata; GPIO	ADCdata; MCLK	BCLK; GPIO	GND; GND	Vcc; Vcc

- I2C/UART/SPI:
  - INT - interrupt, slave to master, open-collector, active low
  - RESET - reset signal, master to slave, active low
- SPI:
  - CS - chipselect, active low
- H-bridge
  - EN - enable, active high, can be used with PWM
  - SenseA/SenseB - input from quadrature encoder for speed and direction

== History ==
Digilent was founded in 2000 by two Washington State University electrical engineering professors.

In 2011, v1.0.0 of Pmod Interface Specification was released.

In January 2013, National Instruments acquired all outstanding shares of Digilent Inc., which became a wholly owned subsidiary.

History of Pmod specification
Year	Version	Notes	Refs
2011	1.0.0	First release	
2017	1.1.0	.	
2017	1.2.0	.	
2020	1.3.0	.	
2020	1.3.1	Current release	

== See also ==
- Asynchronous serial bus such as RS-232 and RS-422.
- UEXT, a similar "Universal EXTension" connector format also for UART, I^{2}C, and SPI, although separately over 10 wires in a 2x5 layout.
- * CRUVI FPGA Card FPGA daughter card standard of Standardization Group for Embedded Technologies e.V. (SGET) with Pmod option
