= Han card =

Chinese computer hardware card made in the 1980's

The Han card (汉卡) or Lianxiang Han card (联想汉卡) was a type of ISA hardware card for the PC in the 1980s in the People's Republic of China. The card allowed the input of Chinese characters into computers.

== History ==
The inventor of the card was Ni Guangnan (倪光南) at the Chinese Academy of Engineering. The product was invented under company Lianxiang (联想集团), which is today's Lenovo. The first generation of the card was released in 1985.

== Model names ==
1. LX-80 Lianxiang Han Card

== See also ==
- Chinese language card
- Industry Standard Architecture (ISA)
