= Audio/modem riser =

Computer expansion slot for analog functionality

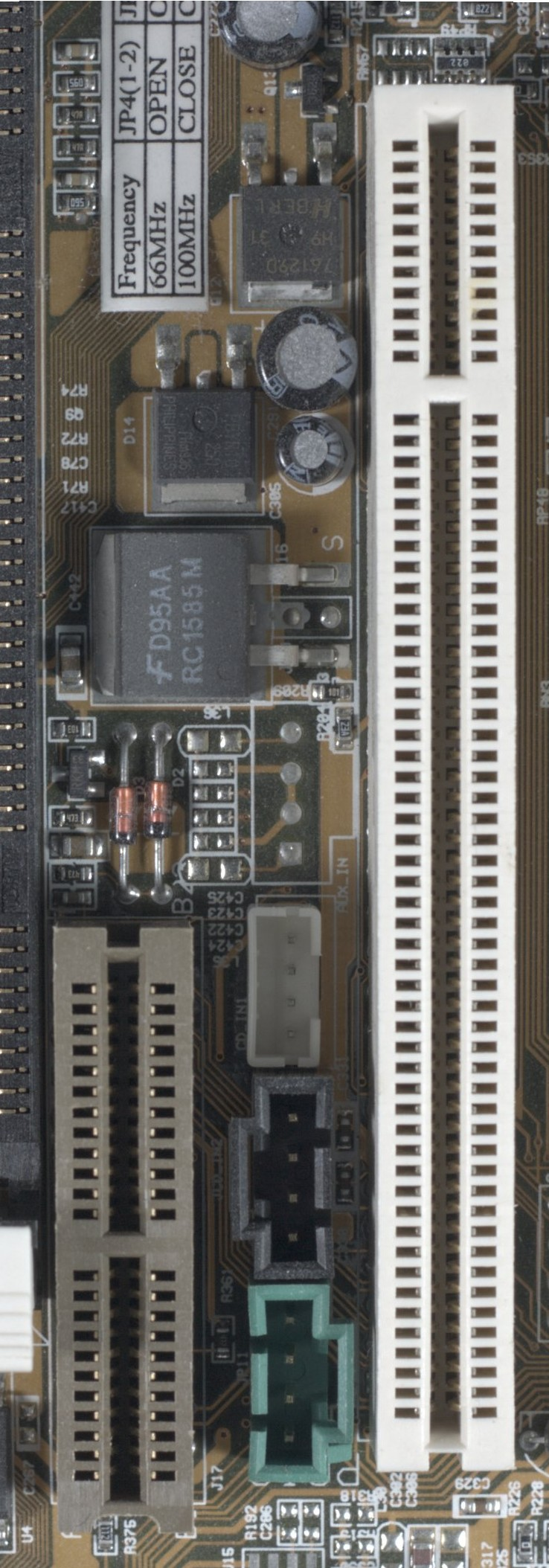
AMR (brown, at left), with PCI slot (white, at right) for comparison

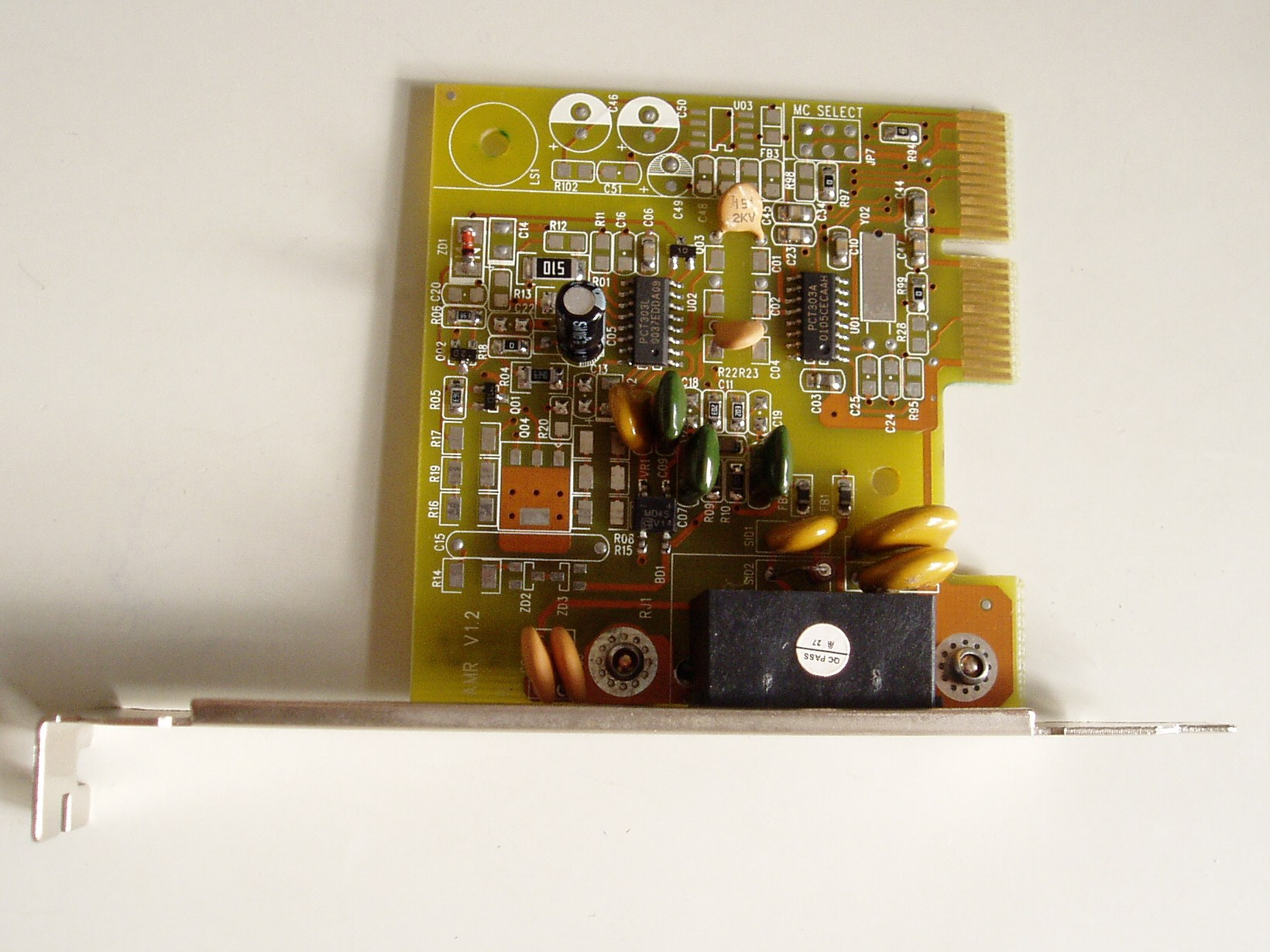
A modem with AMR interface

The audio/modem riser (AMR) is a riser expansion slot found on the motherboards of some Pentium III, Pentium 4, Duron, and Athlon personal computers. It was designed by Intel to interface with chipsets and provide analog functionality, such as sound cards and modems, on an expansion card.

== Technology ==
Physically, it has two rows of 23 pins, making 46 pins total. Three drawbacks of AMR are that it eliminates one PCI slot, it is not plug and play, and it does not allow for hardware accelerated cards (only software-based).

Technologically, it has been superseded by the Advanced Communications Riser (ACR) and Intel's own communications and networking riser (CNR). However, riser technologies in general never really took off. Modems generally remained as PCI cards while audio and network interfaces were integrated on to motherboards.

== See also ==
- Advanced Communications Riser (ACR)
- GeoPort
- Mobile Daughter Card
