= Mobile daughter card =

The mobile daughter card, also known as an MDC or CDC (communications daughter card), is a notebook version of the AMR slot on the motherboard of a desktop computer. It is designed to interface with special Ethernet (EDC), modem (MDC) or bluetooth (BDC) cards.

== Intel MDC specification 1.0 ==
In 1999, Intel published a specification for mobile audio/modem daughter cards. The document defines a standard connector (AMP* 3-179397-0), mechanical elements including several form factors, and electrical interface. The 30-pin connector carries power, several audio channels and AC-Link serial data. Up to two AC'97 codecs are supported on such a card.

Several form factors are specified:

- 45 × 27 mm
- 45 × 37 mm
- 55 × 27 mm with RJ11 jack
- 55 × 37 mm with RJ11 jack
- 45 × 55 mm
- 45 × 70 mm

== 30-pin AMP* 3-179397-0 pinout ==
1	MONO_OUT/PC_BEEP	AUDIO_PWRDN	2
3	GND	MONO_PHONE	4
5	AUXA_RIGHT	RESERVED	6
7	AUXA_LEFT	GND	8
9	CD_GND	5 Vmain	10
11	CD_RIGHT	RESERVED	12
13	CD_LEFT	RESERVED	14
15	GND	PRIMARY_DN	16
17	3.3Vaux/dual	5VD	18
19	GND	GND	20
21	3.3 Vmain	AC97_SYNC	22
23	AC97_SDATA_OUT	AC97_SDATA_INB	24
25	AC97_RESET#	AC97_SDATA_INA	26
27	GND	GND	28
29	AC97_MSTRCLK	AC97_BITCLK	30

== See also ==
- Daughter board
