= GreenSpring Computers =

GreenSpring Computers was a computer manufacturer founded in 1984 by Leonard and Henry Lehmann in Redwood City, California.

== History ==
GreenSpring Computers was started in 1984 as VME Specialists. The original product focus was VMEbus cards for industrial automation. The company was founded by Leonard Lehmann and his father Henry Lehmann in Redwood City, California, United States.

Around 1988, the company changed its name to GreenSpring Computers. With the name change came a change of focus away from VMEbus specific products to industrial automation products. The company worked with Apple Computers and SuperMac Technologies to design and manufacture the first video cards for the new Macintosh II product family. With the new Macintosh computers came the vision that the embedded market was looking for alternatives to industrial PCs running DOS. The RackMac became the only industrial version of the Macintosh computer available. In addition to the main computer (RM1200) was a 14" monitor available with a touchscreen (RM1240 w/o touchscreen and RM1250 w/ touchscreen).

GreenSpring Computers was acquired by SBS Technologies in April 1995. In 2006, SBS Technologies was acquired by GE Fanuc Embedded Systems. The SBS headquarters in Albuquerque is now the headquarters for GE Fanuc Embedded Systems.

== Original product line ==
Product name	Product description
SBC1	Motorola 68000/ Motorola 68010 based VMEbus CPU module
SBC2	Motorola 68000/ Motorola 68010 based VMEbus CPU module with dual-ported memory
SBC3	Motorola 68020 based VMEbus CPU module
DRAM 512/2M	512 and 2M VMEbus memory module. Memory was DIP and populated into sockets.
DRAM 4M	4M VMEbus memory module. Memory was ZIP (Zig zag inline package).
VME360	VMEbus video card
VME490	VMEbus RS232/422 serial card
VME620	VMEbus SCSI interface
VME750	Floating Point module for SBC1. Motorola 68881

== Mezzanine modules ==
With the focus moving away from VMEbus only, Leonard brought on Kim Rubin to develop a bus independent module called IndustryPacks (IP). IndustryPack became recognized as an industry standard for mezzanine modules and was adopted by ANSI as VITA 4. These mezzanine modules are approximately the size of a business card (99mm x 45mm). Featuring a 16 or 32 bit wide I/O interface and 50 User defined I/O pins.

Original IPs

IP name	IP description
IP-Digital24	24-channel TTL input and output, programmable bits, supports RMW, bit set/reset, 64mA sink
IP-Digital48	48 general purpose lines of bit I/O including a 24-bit timer
IP-DUAL PI/T	Two MC68230s for timers/interface, 68230 includes two 8-bit or one 16-bit programmable port, two 24-bit timers
IP-488	IEEE-488 Interface. Talker, listener, controller
IP-Serial	Two Channel Serial, 2 multi-protocol RS-232/422/485, async/sync to 2 megabaud, SDLC, HDLC, X.25. Interrupts.
VME310	VMEbus 3U A24/D16, IRQ1,3,4,6 selectable. Supports 2 IP's
VME610	VMEbus 6U A24/D16, IRQ 1-7 selectable. Supports 4 IP's
RM1260	NuBus intelligent carrier. Supports 2 IP's
RM1270	NuBus support Carrier. Supports 2 IP's

The big advancements for IPs was when Motorola adopted the standard for their MVME162 processor line (see Motorola Single Board Computers) based on the Motorola 68040. In a short time, there were multiple IP manufacturers and over 100 different IP modules available.

== Final product line ==
Category	Product	Form	Channels	Description
Analog Converters	IP-16ADC	IP	16	High accuracy 16 bit ADC
Analog Converters	IP-16DAC	IP	3	High stability 16 DAC
Analog Converters	IP-AD12SS	IP	8	Simultaneous sampling 12 bit ADC
Analog Converters	IP-AD16SS	IP	8	Simultaneous sampling 16 bit ADC
Analog Converters	IP-DAC	IP	6	General purpose 12 bit DAC
Analog Converters	IP-DAC-SU	IP	16	Simultaneous update 16 bit DAC
Analog Converters	IP-HIADC	IP	16	"High speed, simultaneous sampling 16 bit ADC"
Analog Converters	IP-OPTOAD12	IP	16	Opto-isolated 12 bit ADC
Analog Converters	IP-OPTOAD16	IP	16	Opto-isolated 16 bit ADC
Analog Converters	IP-OPTODA12	IP	8	Opto-isolated 12 bit DAC
Analog Converters	IP-OPTODA16	IP	4	Opto-isolated 16 bit DAC
Analog Converters	IP-PRECADC	IP	20+2	Resistive bridge driver and 12 bit ADC and DAC
Analog Converters	IP-UL-ADC40	IP	40	General purpose 12 bit ADC with timer and strobe
Analog Converters	IP-UL-AUDIO	IP	2+2	Audio 16-bit sigma-delta ADC and DAC
Analog Converters	IP-UL-AUDIO-4	IP	4+4	Audio 16-bit sigma-delta ADC and DAC
Analog Converters	IP-UL-DAQ200	IP	2+2	High speed 16-bit sigma-delta ADC and DAC with FIFO
Analog Converters	PMC-UL-GPIO	PMC	8+8	General purpose 12 bit ADC and DAC with digital I/O
Audio	P1-AUDIO	PCMIP	Stereo	Soundblaster compatible audio I/O with amplifier
Audio	PMC-AUDIO	PMC	Stereo	Soundblaster compatible audio I/O with amplifier
Avionics Communication	IP-1553	IP	1	Dual-redundant with ILC DDC module
Data Storage	IP-FLASH	IP		Up to 8 MB Flash memory
Data Storage	IP-NVRAM	IP		1 MB battery-backed SRAM
Data Storage	P-D64	PCMIP		64 MB DRAM
Data Storage	P-F64	PCMIP		64 MB Intel StrataFlash
Data Storage	PMC-PCMCIA	PMC		PCMCIA (PC Card) type I or II card socket
Data Storage	PMC-USCSI	PMC	1	Ultra Wide SCSI to 40 MB/sec front/rear/SE/DIFF
Digital I/O – Buffered TTL	IP-ALTERA-TTL	IP	32	User-programmable FPGA
Digital I/O – Buffered TTL	IP-UNIDIG	IP	24	General purpose I/O
Digital I/O – Buffered TTL	IP-UNIDIG-I	IP	24	General purpose I/O with interrupts
Digital I/O – Buffered TTL	IP-UNIDIG-IO-12I12O	IP	24	Opto-isolated with interrupts
Digital I/O – Buffered TTL	IP-UNIDIG-IO-24I	IP	24	Opto-isolated with interrupts
Digital I/O – Buffered TTL	IP-UNIDIG-IO-24IO	IP	24	Opto-isolated with interrupts
Digital I/O – Buffered TTL	IP-UNIDIG-O-12I12O	IP	24	Opto-isolated
Digital I/O – Buffered TTL	IP-UNIDIG-O-24I	IP	24	Opto-isolated
Digital I/O – Buffered TTL	IP-UNIDIG-O-24IO	IP	24	Opto-isolated
Digital I/O – Buffered TTL	IP-UNIDIG-P	IP	16	Parallel transfers with hardware handshake modes
Digital I/O – Buffered TTL	IP-XILINX-BUF	IP	24	User-programmable FPGA
Digital I/O – Buffered TTL	IP-XILINX-XX-BUF	IP	24	Two user-programmable FPGAs
Digital I/O – Buffered TTL	P1-IO32	PCMIP	32	General purpose I/O with interrupts
Digital I/O – Buffered TTL	P2-IO32	PCMIP	32	"General purpose I/O with interrupts, front panel I/O"
Digital I/O – Buffered TTL	PMC-UL-GPIO	PMC	16	"Also includes ADC, DAC, and timers"
Digital I/O – Differential 422	IP-ALTERA	IP	20	User-programmable FPGA
Digital I/O – Differential 422	IP-UNIDIG-D	IP	24	General purpose I/O
Digital I/O – Differential 422	IP-UNIDIG-I-D	IP	24	General purpose I/O with interrupts
Digital I/O – Differential 422	IP-UNIDIG-P-D	IP	16	Parallel transfers with hardware handshake modes
Digital I/O – Differential 422	IP-XILINX-422	IP	24	User-programmable FPGA
Digital I/O – Differential 422	IP-XILINX-XX-422	IP	24	Two user-programmable FPGAs
Digital I/O – High-side (FET)	IP-OPTO-DRV	IP	16	Opto-isolated
Digital I/O – Low-side (FET)	IP-DRIVER40	IP	40	User-programmable FPGA
Digital I/O – Low-side (FET)	IP-UNIDIG-HV-16I8O	IP	24	High voltage
Digital I/O – Low-side (FET)	IP-UNIDIG-HV-8I16O	IP	24	High voltage
Digital I/O – Low-side (FET)	IP-UNIDIG-IHV-16I8O	IP	24	High voltage with interrupts
Digital I/O – Low-side (FET)	IP-UNIDIG-IHV-8I16O	IP	24	High voltage with interrupts
Digital I/O – Mechanical Relay	IP-RELAY	IP	8	"Each is DPDT, latching"
Digital I/O – Opto-Isolated	IP-OPTO-DRV	IP	16	Outputs only
Digital I/O – Opto-Isolated	IP-OPTO-INT	IP	8	Supports interrupts
Digital I/O – Opto-Isolated	IP-UNIDIG-IO-12I12O	IP	24	Inputs and outputs
Digital I/O – Opto-Isolated	IP-UNIDIG-IO-24I	IP	24	Input only
Digital I/O – Opto-Isolated	IP-UNIDIG-IO-24IO	IP	24	Programmable as input or output
Digital I/O – Opto-Isolated	IP-UNIDIG-O-12I12O	IP	24	Inputs and outputs with interrupts
Digital I/O – Opto-Isolated	IP-UNIDIG-O-24I	IP	24	Input only with interrupts
Digital I/O – Opto-Isolated	IP-UNIDIG-O-24IO	IP	24	Programmable as input or output with interrupts
Digital I/O – Unbuffered TTL	IP-ALTERA	IP	8	User-programmable FPGA includes EIA-422
Digital I/O – Unbuffered TTL	IP-ALTERA-TTL	IP	16	User-programmable FPGA
Digital I/O – Unbuffered TTL	IP-UNIDIG-E	IP	24	ESD protected
Digital I/O – Unbuffered TTL	IP-UNIDIG-E-48	IP	48	ESD protected
Digital I/O – Unbuffered TTL	IP-UNIDIG-I-E	IP	24	ESD protected with interrupts
Digital I/O – Unbuffered TTL	IP-XILINX-ESD	IP	24	User-programmable FPGA
Digital I/O – Unbuffered TTL	IP-XILINX-XX-ESD	IP	24	Two user-programmable FPGAs
Ethernet	CP-3101	CPCI 3U	2	Dual 10BaseT/100BaseTX Ethernet with front panel RJ45
Ethernet	IP-ETHERNET-10B2	IP	1	10Base2 Ethernet when used with transition module
Ethernet	IP-ETHERNET-10B5	IP	1	10Base5 Ethernet when used with transition module
Ethernet	IP-ETHERNET-10BT	IP	1	10BaseT Ethernet when used with transition module
Ethernet	P2-100BT-ER	PCMIP	1	10BaseT/100BaseTX Ethernet with front panel RJ45
Ethernet	PMC-100BT	PMC	1	Single 10BaseT/100BaseTX Ethernet with front panel RJ45
Ethernet	PMC-3101	PMC	2	Dual 10BaseT/100BaseTX Ethernet with front panel RJ45
Industrial Busses	IP-488	IP		GPIB IEEE-488 bus controller/talker/listener
Industrial Busses	PMC-ARCNET	PMC		ARCNET with isolated 485 or traditional interface
Industrial Busses	PMC-ECAN	PMC		Dual isolated CAN busses using Intel 82527
IndustryPack Carriers	ATC30	ISA	3	Short ISA carrier
IndustryPack Carriers	ATC40	ISA	4	Long ISA carrier
IndustryPack Carriers	CPCI-100A-BP	CPCI 3U	2	Rear panel I/O via J2
IndustryPack Carriers	CPCI-100A-FP	CPCI 3U	2	Front panel I/O via Champ50s
IndustryPack Carriers	CPCI-200A-BP	CPCI 6U	4	"Rear panel I/O via J4, J5"
IndustryPack Carriers	CPCI-200A-FP	CPCI 6U	4	Front panel I/O via SCSI-style connectors
IndustryPack Carriers	FLEX104A	PC/104	2	Slightly larger than standard PC/104
IndustryPack Carriers	IPOC-1747	AB	2	Allen-Bradley Open Controller
IndustryPack Carriers	IPPC-2636A	VME 6U	4	Fits onto Motorola MVME 2300/2600 series CPUs
IndustryPack Carriers	PCI-40A	PCI	4	Full length PCI slot size
IndustryPack Carriers	PCI-60A	PCI	6	Full length ISA slot size
IndustryPack Carriers	SPI-200	ISA	4	DSPLink3 bus provides access to modules
IndustryPack Carriers	SPV-200	VME 6U	4	DSPLink3 bus provides access to modules
IndustryPack Carriers	VIPC310	VME 3U	2	Front panel ribbon connectors
IndustryPack Carriers	VIPC310-HD51	VME 3U	2	High density 51-pin connectors on front panel
IndustryPack Carriers	VIPC310-TX	VME 3U	2	Twinax connectors for IP-1553
IndustryPack Carriers	VIPC360	VME 3U	2	Carrier with MC68360 CPU
IndustryPack Carriers	VIPC616	VME 6U	4	Ribbon cable connectors on front panel
IndustryPack Carriers	VIPC618	VME 6U	4	Shielded SCSI-style connectors on front panel
IndustryPack Carriers	VIPC664	VME 6U	4	I/O is via rear panel VME64x connectors
IndustryPack Carriers	VIPC860-BP	VME 6U	4	Carrier with PowerPC 860 CPU and I/O via rear panel VME64x
IndustryPack Carriers	VIPC860-FP	VME 6U	4	Carrier with PowerPC 860 CPU and I/O via front panel Champ50s
Motion Control and Measurement	IP-ENCODER6	IP	6	16 bit quadrature position encoder
Motion Control and Measurement	IP-QUADRATURE	IP	4	Quadrature decoder with 24 bit resolution
Motion Control and Measurement	IP-STEPPER	IP	2	Two-axis stepper motor controller
Motion Control and Measurement	IP-SYNCHRO	IP	2	Synchro and resolver with 16 bit resolution
PC•MIP and PMC Carriers	MC-101	PCI	1	PCMIP mechanical adaptor to short PCI slot
PC•MIP and PMC Carriers	MC-101DB	PCI	1	PCMIP mechanical adaptor to PCI slot with debug headers
PC•MIP and PMC Carriers	MC-303	CPCI 3U	3	Front and rear I/O for PCMIP
PC•MIP and PMC Carriers	MC-607	CPCI 6U	6	Front and rear I/O for PCMIP
PC•MIP and PMC Carriers	MC-804	PCI	4	Full length PCI slot PCMIP
Reflective Memory	IP-FIBERIO	IP	1	1 Gbit optical ring with 512 KB of shared memory and interrupts
Serial Communication Modules	CP-6201	CPCI 6U	16	"General purpose async 232 to 115.2 k front and rear I/O, FIFO"
Serial Communication Modules	IP-COMM360	IP	4	MC68360 CPU with TTL serial interfaces
Serial Communication Modules	IP-COMM360-EN	IP	4	MC68360 CPU with TTL serial interfaces for Ethernet
Serial Communication Modules	IP-COMM360-MH	IP	4	MC68360 CPU with TTL serial interfaces for E1/T1
Serial Communication Modules	IP-MP-SERIAL	IP	2	High speed sync 232/422 with modem lines
Serial Communication Modules	IP-MP-SERIAL-232	IP	2	High speed sync with modem lines EIA-232 only
Serial Communication Modules	IP-MP-SERIAL-423	IP	2	High speed sync with modem lines EIA-423 only
Serial Communication Modules	IP-OCTAL-232	IP	8	General purpose async 232 with flow control
Serial Communication Modules	IP-OCTAL-422	IP	8	General purpose async 422
Serial Communication Modules	IP-OCTAL-423	IP	8	General purpose async 423 with flow control
Serial Communication Modules	IP-OCTAL-485	IP	8	General purpose async 485
Serial Communication Modules	IP-OCTALOPTO	IPDW	8	General purpose opto-isolated 232/422/423/20mA
Serial Communication Modules	IP-OCTALPLUS-232	IP	8	General purpose async 232 with flow control and deep FIFOs
Serial Communication Modules	IP-OCTALPLUS-422	IP	8	General purpose async 422 with deep FIFOs
Serial Communication Modules	IP-OCTALPLUS-485	IP	8	General purpose async/sync 485
Serial Communication Modules	IP-OCTALPLUS-TTL	IP	8	General purpose async TTL with flow control and deep FIFOs
Serial Communication Modules	IP-SERIAL	IP	2	General purpose async 232/422 with modem lines
Serial Communication Modules	P1-OCTAL-232	PCMIP	8	General purpose async 232 to 115.2 k
Serial Communication Modules	P1-OCTAL-422	PCMIP	8	General purpose async 422 to 480.6 k
Serial Communication Modules	P2-HSS2	PCMIP	2	"High speed sync 232/422/449/530 with modem lines FIFO, DMA"
Serial Communication Modules	P2-OCTAL-232	PCMIP	8	General purpose async 232 to 115.2 k front panel I/O
Serial Communication Modules	P2-OCTAL-422	PCMIP	8	General purpose async 422 to 480.6 k front panel I/O
Serial Communication Modules	PMC-HSSERIAL	PMC	4	"High speed sync 232/422/449/530 with modem lines FIFO, DMA"
Serial Communication Modules	PMC-OCTPRO-232	PMC	8	General purpose async 232 to 115.2 k front and rear I/O
Serial Communication Modules	PMC-OCTPRO-422	PMC	8	General purpose async 422 to 480.6 k front and rear I/O
Telecommunications	IP-COMM360	IP	4	Synchronous serial and ISDN
Telecommunications	PMC-8260-400	PMC	4	Quad intelligent PowerPC 8260-based E1/T1 with SCSA bus
Telecommunications	VIPC860	VME 6U	4	High speed synchronous serial
Temperature Measurement	IP-THERMISTOR	IP	16	12 bit thermistor measurement for 2 or 4 wire devices
Timers	IP-UL-ADC40	IP	1	Includes ADCs
Timers	IP-UL-AUDIO	IP	2	"Includes ADCs, DACs"
Timers	IP-UL-DAQ200	IP	2	"Includes ADCs, DACs"
Timers	IP-UNIDIG-T	IP	4	"16-bit timers cascadable into two 32-bit, buffered I/O"
Timers	IP-UNIDIG-T-D	IP	4	"16-bit timers cascadable into two 32-bit, differential I/O"
Timers	PMC-UL-GPIO	PMC	2	"Includes ADCs, DACs, digital I/O"
Transition Modules	TM-680	CPCI 6U	6	Rear panel I/O for MC-607
Transition Modules	XM-360-16	VME 6U	16	VME-mounted with RJ45s for four IP-COMM360s 422 only
Transition Modules	XM-360-4	VME 6U	4	VME-mounted with HD26s for IP-COMM360
Transition Modules	XM-360-EN	VME 6U	3	VME-mounted with Ethernet for IP-COMM360-EN
Transition Modules	XM-360-MH	VME 6U	4	T1 interfaces up to four IP-COMM360-MH
Transition Modules	XM-664-60	VME	4	Rear panel IndustryPack I/O for VIPC664 and VIPC860-BP
Transition Modules	XM-664-61	VME	4	Rear panel IndustryPack I/O for VIPC664 and VIPC860-BP
Transition Modules	XM-664-80	VME	4	Rear panel IndustryPack I/O for VIPC664 and VIPC860-BP
Transition Modules	XM-860	VME 6U	4	Rear panel serial I/O for VIPC860-FP
Transition Modules	XM-LCD	-	1	Power supply and connector for flat panel displays
Transition Modules	XM-OCTAL	19”	16	19 inch rack mount bar for two IP-Octal series modules
Transition Modules	XM-OCTAL-6U-D	VME 6U	8	VME-mounted with DB25s for IP-Octal series modules
Transition Modules	XM-OCTAL-6U-RJ16	VME 6U	16	VME-mounted with RJ11s for IP-Octal series modules
Transition Modules	XM-OCTAL-6U-RJ8	VME 6U	8	VME-mounted with RJ45s for IP-Octal series modules
Transition Modules	XM-SYNCHRO	-	1	Provides reference and connections for IP-Synchro
Video Displays	IP-LCD	IP	1	SVGA CRT and LCD 640x480
Video Displays	P2-VIDEO	PCMIP	1	CRT display to 1024x768 with front panel output
Video Displays	PMC-VIDEOPLUS	PMC	1	CRT display to 1280x1024 with front panel output
