= Raspberry Shake =

Personal seismometer

Raspberry Shake S.A.
- Raspberry Shake Logo

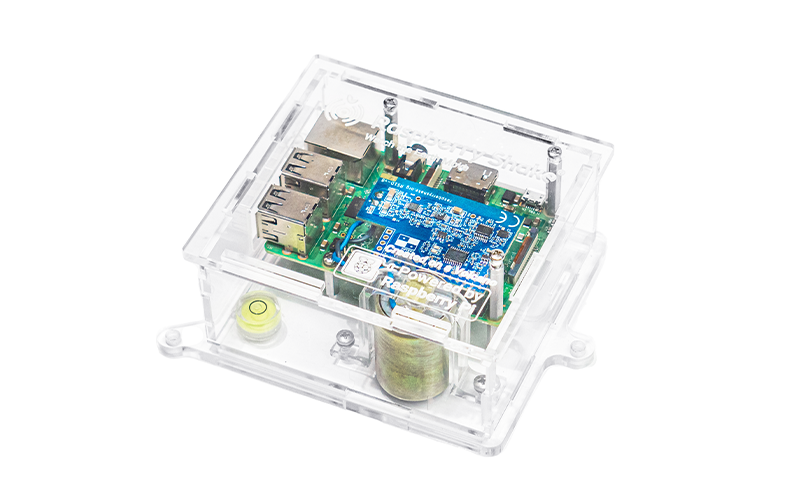
- Raspberry Shake 1D - Vertical Motion Seismograph
- Industry: Electronics Industry
- Founded: 2016; 10 years ago in Chiriquí, Panama
- Founder: Branden Christensen
- Headquarters: Panamá
- Number of employees: 20
- Website: raspberryshake.org

Raspberry Shake is a Panama-based company that designs and manufactures personal seismic and infrasonic sensors, utilizing Raspberry Pi hardware.

== History ==
Raspberry Shake was developed in the Chiriquí province under the Western Seismic Observatory of Panama which creates hardware and software for tectonic phenomena measurement.

While the origins of Raspberry Shake can be traced back to Western Seismic Observatory of Panama, it evolved into an independent company in 2020 when the trademark was registered.

In the years 2015 and 2016, Raspberry Shake began its initial forays into the development of seismic detection software and hardware with the creation of Raspberry Shake 1D. By the end of 2017, hardware and software improvements were added, resulting in the Raspberry Shake 3D Sensor, which brought the capability to capture waves vertically and horizontally. Through continuous development, the Raspberry Shake 4D sensor was launched in July 2017, featuring integrated accelerometers directly on the board.

In early 2018, the Raspberry Boom sensor focused on infrasonic detection was developed; that same year, technologies were combined with those of the Raspberry Shake 1D sensor to launch the Raspberry Shake & Boom, opening up possibilities for seismic and infrasonic detection in a single device.

The company later introduced the Raspberry Shake 6D (RS6D), which combines the three-component geophone configuration of the Raspberry Shake 3D with the MEMS accelerometer of the Raspberry Shake 4D, recording both ground velocity and ground acceleration along three axes.

== Technology ==
The Raspberry Shake is a device that pairs with the Raspberry Pi to function as a personal seismograph. It incorporates a geophone which converts ground movements into electrical signals. An additional board amplifies and digitizes this signal, which is then processed by the Raspberry Pi.

The Raspberry Shake utilizes software similar to that used by the United States Geological Survey (USGS). As technology, particularly mini-computers like the Raspberry Pi, has evolved, the company introduced additional devices, including the sensor "Raspberry Shake 1D" with different detection capabilities.

== Scientific use ==
In 2018, researchers at the United States Geological Survey published an independent evaluation of the Raspberry Shake 4D in Seismological Research Letters, assessing its laboratory performance and field observations relative to professional seismic instrumentation.

Data from Raspberry Shake stations have been used in peer-reviewed research. A 2020 study published in Science documenting the global reduction in high-frequency seismic noise during COVID-19 lockdowns drew on citizen-operated stations, including Raspberry Shake devices. City-scale studies of urban seismic noise during the lockdowns were also conducted with the devices in Barcelona, Spain, and Querétaro, Mexico.

In Haiti, a network of citizen-hosted Raspberry Shake stations has been used to complement regional broadband stations for routine earthquake monitoring, and provided near-field data used to study the 2021 Haiti earthquake and its aftershock sequence. In Nepal, the devices have been installed in schools as part of an educational seismology program established after the 2015 Gorkha earthquake.

The devices have also been applied to structural health monitoring: a 2022 study used Raspberry Shake 4D units installed in multistorey buildings in Bucharest, Romania, to identify the buildings' vibration characteristics under seismic excitation. Other applications include volcano monitoring, such as analysis of the tephra fall from the 2020 Taal Volcano eruption, and monitoring of induced seismicity associated with geothermal energy projects. In 2026, researchers published RSDB, a machine-learning dataset containing approximately 333,000 seismic waveforms recorded by more than 2,400 Raspberry Shake stations between 2022 and 2024.
