= Raspberry Pi Holdings =

British technology business

Raspberry Pi Holdings plc
- Formerly: Raspberry Pi (Trading) Ltd (2012‍–‍2021); Raspberry Pi Ltd (2021‍–‍2024)
- Type: Public
- Traded as: LSE: RPI; FTSE 250 component
- ISIN: GB00BS3DYQ52
- Industry: Technology
- Founded: 18 December 2012; 13 years ago
- Headquarters: Cambridge, England
- Key people: Martin Hellawell (Chairman); Eben Upton (CEO)
- Products: Raspberry Pi
- Production output: ▲7.6 million (2025)
- Revenue: ▲US$323.2 million (2025)
- Operating income: ▲US$28.0 million (2025)
- Net income: ▲US$21.7 million (2025)
- Total assets: ▲US$331.6 million (2025)
- Total equity: ▲US$240.8 million (2025)
- Owners: Raspberry Pi Foundation (41%); SoftBank Group (13%)
- Divisions: Raspberry Pi Press
- Website: raspberrypi.com
- Footnotes; Financials as of 31 December 2025. References

Raspberry Pi Holdings plc is a British technology company that designs and markets single-board computers (SBCs), semiconductors, and related accessories marketed under the Raspberry Pi brand.

The first Raspberry Pi computer was developed by the Raspberry Pi Foundation, a charity promoting computer science education setup in 2009. Launched in 2012, the Raspberry Pi was quickly adopted by both hobbyists and professionals, and became widely used in industrial and embedded applications as well. To support commercialisation and growing demand, the Foundation created a subsidiary, initially named Raspberry Pi (Trading) Ltd, in 2012. Since its creation, the company has overseen production development and manufacturing, the profits generated from its operations have supported the charitable activities of the Foundation. The two entities share several senior leadership figures, such as Eben Upton, who has served as both the CEO of the Raspberry Pi (Trading) Ltd and the Foundation.

In June 2024, the company became a public company via an initial public offering and was listed on the London Stock Exchange as Raspberry Pi Holdings plc. Consiquently, the Foundation and the public company operate independently, although the Foundation remains a major shareholder. Other key shareholders have included Arm and Sony, both of which have been involved in the Raspberry Pi's manufacturing process. The Foundation's stake in the firm has gradually reduced over time as shares have been sold to fund the creation of an endowment for its educational activities.

== History ==
The Raspberry Pi Foundation, a UK-based nonprofit, was established in autumn 2008 to promote the study of computer science in schools. To support this mission, it developed a small, low-cost single-board computer, the Raspberry Pi. The first model was released in 2012 and, although initially aimed at education, it was quickly adopted by computing and electronics hobbyists. According to the organization, many of these users later applied their experience with Raspberry Pi in professional and industrial contexts.

To commercialize the product and meet increasing demand, the Foundation created a wholly owned subsidiary, Raspberry Pi (Trading) Ltd, in late 2012 to handle product development and manufacturing. Profits from the commercial entity were used to support the Foundation’s charitable activities. Between 2012 and 2024, the subsidiary contributed nearly US$50 million to the Foundation.

Eben Upton, a co-founder, stepped down from the Foundation’s board in December 2012 to serve as CEO of both the Foundation and the new trading company. In September 2013, Lance Howarth was appointed CEO of the Foundation, allowing Upton to focus on leading the commercial business. In 2021, Raspberry Pi (Trading) Ltd was renamed Raspberry Pi Ltd. In early 2024, ownership of the commercial entity was transferred to a new parent company, Raspberry Pi Holdings, which was 77.31% owned by the foundation.

In May 2024, the company announced that it would go public during the following month. On 3 June 2024, Raspberry Pi Holdings registered as a public limited company, and subsequently completed an initial public offering (IPO) on the London Stock Exchange.

The Foundation supported the move and stated that proceeds from share sales would be used to establish an endowment for its educational programs, while maintaining a significant stake in the commercial entity. In the months following the IPO, the Foundation's ownership stake in Raspberry Pi Holdings decreased to 49.08 percent; further gradual decreases via the periodic sale of shares have taken place over the following years. In 2026, Upton has opted to repeatedly increase his personal ownership stake in the company.

== Operations ==
The company sources its system on a chip (SoC) components from Broadcom and outsources the majority of its manufacturing to Sony. It also counts Sony and Arm among its strategic shareholders. The company also works with these third-party manufacturers to further develop the Raspberry Pi, while the products assembled by these firms are sold directly to the global customer base.

In 2024, 70 percent of the company’s sales were to industrial customers, primarily for embedded applications, with the remaining 30 percent have been attributed to the enthusiast and education sectors. The company has alo positioned itself to capitalise on the growing AI sector. As of March 2025, the company had sold over 68 million single-board computers.

In addition to its hardware business, the company also operates a publishing division, Raspberry Pi Press, which produces books and magazines, including The Raspberry Pi Official Magazine. The company also operates a retail store in Cambridge, which opened in early 2019, and serves as a space for product demonstrations, events, and direct customer engagement.
