= Eben Upton =

Welsh computer scientist (born 1978)

Eben Upton CBE FREng DFBCS
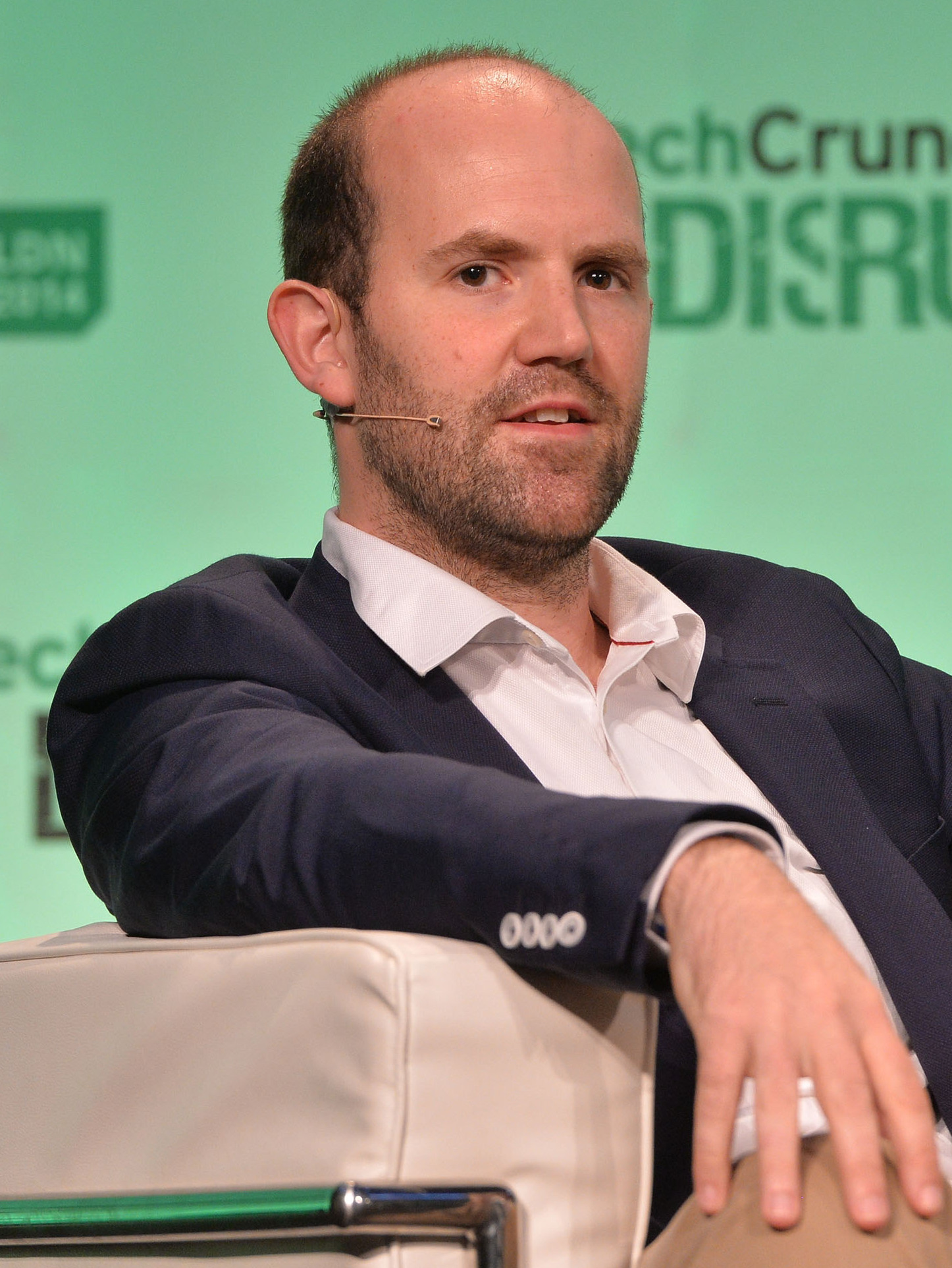
- Upton speaking at an event in 2014
- Born: Eben Christopher Upton; 5 April 1978 (age 48); Griffithstown, Pontypool, Wales, United Kingdom
- Citizenship: British
- Education: University of Cambridge
- Known for: Raspberry Pi
- Spouse: Liz Upton
- Awards: TR35 (2012)
- Scientific career
- Workplaces: Raspberry Pi Holdings; University of Cambridge; St John's College, Cambridge; Ideaworks; Broadcom; Intel; IBM
- Thesis: Compiling with data dependence graphs (2006)
- Doctoral advisor: Martin Richards
- Website: Eben Upton on LinkedIn

Eben Christopher Upton (born 5 April 1978) is the Welsh founder and CEO of Raspberry Pi Holdings and the Raspberry Pi Foundation. He is responsible for the overall software and hardware architecture of the Raspberry Pi device. He is a former technical director and ASIC architect for Broadcom.

== Education and early life ==
Eben Upton was born in Griffithstown near Pontypool, Wales, where his mother is from; his father is linguist Clive Upton. He lived in Lae in Papua New Guinea between the ages of eight weeks and two and a half years. He then returned to the UK where he grew up and was educated at schools in Leeds, Birmingham and Ilkley.

Upton completed a Bachelor of Arts degree in Physics and Engineering in 1999 at the University of Cambridge where he was an undergraduate student at St John's College, Cambridge. He went on to do the Cambridge Diploma in Computer Science graduating in 2001. After his diploma, Upton was a research student in the Computer Laboratory, University of Cambridge. After finishing his PhD degree, he earned a Master of Business Administration (MBA) at the Cambridge Judge Business School.

== Career ==
Before working at Broadcom, Upton served as director of studies in computer science at St John's College, Cambridge, with responsibility for undergraduate admissions. During his academic career, he co-authored papers on mobile services, Human–computer interaction (HCI), bluetooth, data dependency graphs. and Fuel Panics: Insights From Spatial Agent-Based Simulation. He has been a visiting Researcher at Intel Corporation, Founder and Chief Technology Officer at Ideaworks3D and a software engineer at IBM.

Eben Upton moved production of Raspberry Pi computers from China to the Sony UK Technology Centre (Sony UK TEC) at Pencoed, Wales in 2012, 15–20 miles from where he was born.

=== Publications ===
Upton has published books including the Oxford Rhyming Dictionary with his father Clive Upton. With Gareth Halfacree he co-authored the Raspberry Pi User Guide. Upton has also co-authored Learning Computer Architecture with Raspberry Pi, and Code the Classics - Volume 1.

=== Awards and honours ===
Upton has won a number of awards including the Innovators Under 35 (TR35) from MIT Technology Review in 2012 and the Royal Academy of Engineering Silver Medal.

Upton was appointed Commander of the Order of the British Empire (CBE) in the 2016 Birthday Honours for services to business and education.

He was made a Fellow of the Royal Academy of Engineering (FREng) in 2017, and a Distinguished Fellow of the British Computer Society (DFBCS) in 2019.

In 2020, Upton was made an Honorary Fellow St John's College, Cambridge. In the same year, he was awarded the IEEE Masaru Ibuka Consumer Electronics Award and made an Honorary Fellow of the IET (HonFIET).

== Personal life ==
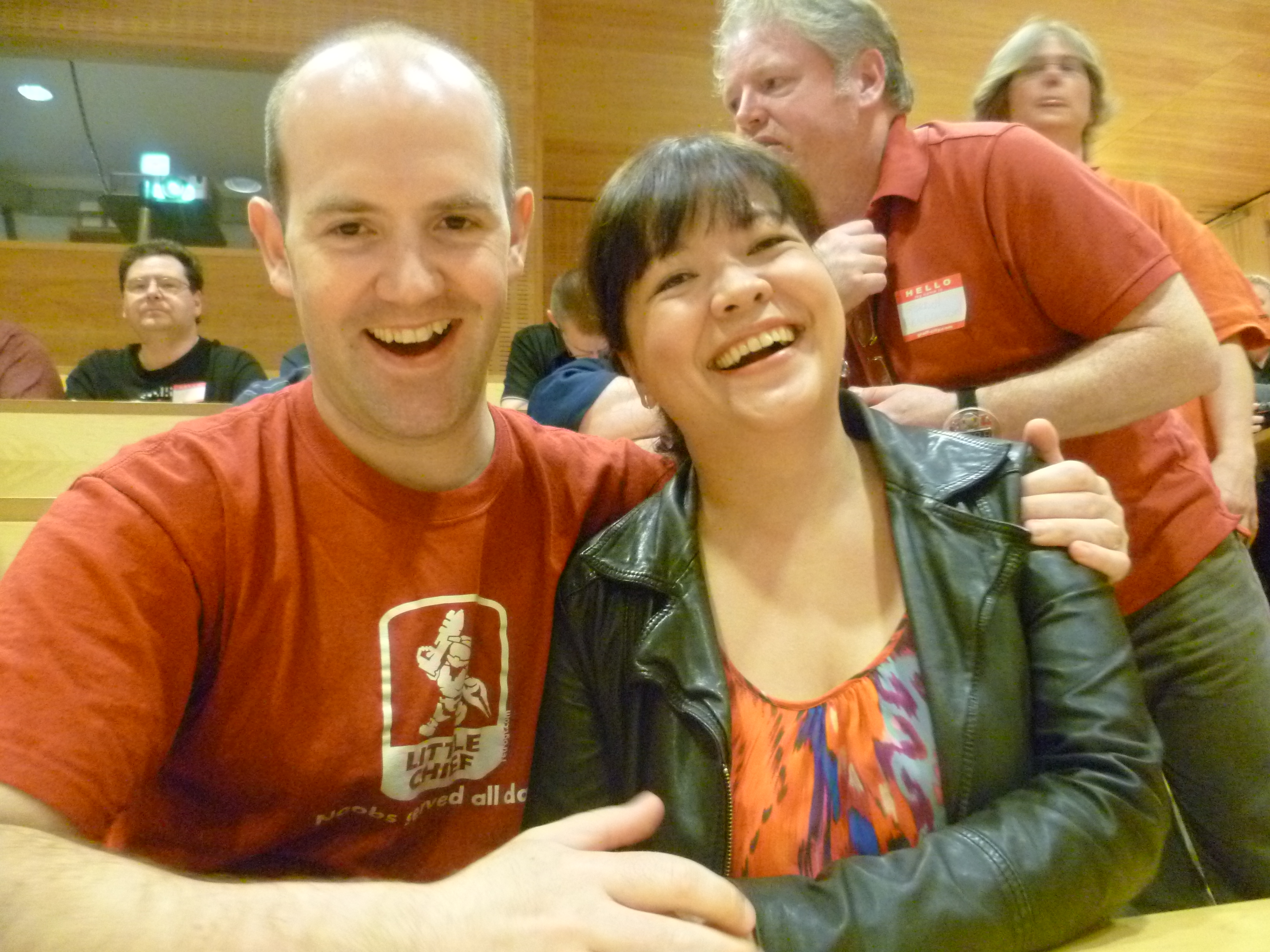
Liz and Eben Upton (2012)

Eben Upton is married to Raspberry Pi co-founder, Liz, whom he met at university.
