= Raspberry Pi Press =

Official Raspberry Pi magazine

- Issue 153 of the Raspberry Pi Official Magazine
- Parent company: Raspberry Pi Holdings
- Founded: 2015
- Headquarters location: Cambridge
- Key people: Eben Upton (CEO, Raspberry Pi Holdings); Helen Lynn (Director of Communications); Brian Jepson (Publishing Director); Lucy Hattersley (Editor, Raspberry Pi Official Magazine)
- Publication types: Magazines, books
- Nonfiction topics: Technology, Raspberry Pi
- Revenue: US$1.2 million (2024)
- No. of employees: 16 (2024)
- Official website: raspberrypi.com/books-magazines

Raspberry Pi Press is the book publishing division of Raspberry Pi Holdings, established in 2015. It produces magazines and books related to the Raspberry Pi computer. As of 2024, Raspberry Pi Holdings reported US$1.2 million in publishing revenue. Sixteen employees were involved in communications and publishing, with approximately five full-time employees working exclusively for the publishing arm.

== Titles published ==
Raspberry Pi Press publishes several titles, including:

- The Raspberry Pi Official Magazine – First published in 2012 as a volunteer-produced online fanzine called The MagPi. It featured user-submitted tutorials, news, and projects. It was brought in-house in March 2015 and in March 2025 the magazine was renamed The Raspberry Pi Official Magazine.
- A selection of Raspberry Pi-related books covering topics such as programming, electronics, and physical computing.

All Raspberry Pi Press publications are made available in digital format for free download, alongside physical copies that are sold online and in retail locations. The content typically includes tutorials, projects, and news related to the Raspberry Pi platform and general maker topics.

In addition to online distribution, Raspberry Pi Press publications are also sold at the official Raspberry Pi Store in Cambridge, which opened in early 2019.

== History ==
The MagPi was first published in May 2012 as a free online magazine created by members of the Raspberry Pi user community. It featured user-submitted tutorials, news, and projects. In 2015, the magazine was adopted as the official publication of the Raspberry Pi Foundation and began regular print circulation.

Early reception was mixed: LinuxNov praised it as informative and helpful, while I Programmer noted its limited content due to early hardware shortages but considered the effort commendable. A review in The Wall Street Journal described it as having a nostalgic tone but questioned its appeal to newer audiences.

In December 2017, Raspberry Pi Press launched HackSpace Magazine, to serve the broader maker community by creating a global hackerspace. The magazine was discontinued after Issue 81 in August 2024, with the company saying it would additional pages to The MagPi to make room for the stories and tutorials that would have previously been published in HackSpace.

In March 2025, beginning with issue 151, The MagPi was renamed to The Raspberry Pi Official Magazine.
