= Pi-KVM =

KVM-over-IP based on Raspberry Pi

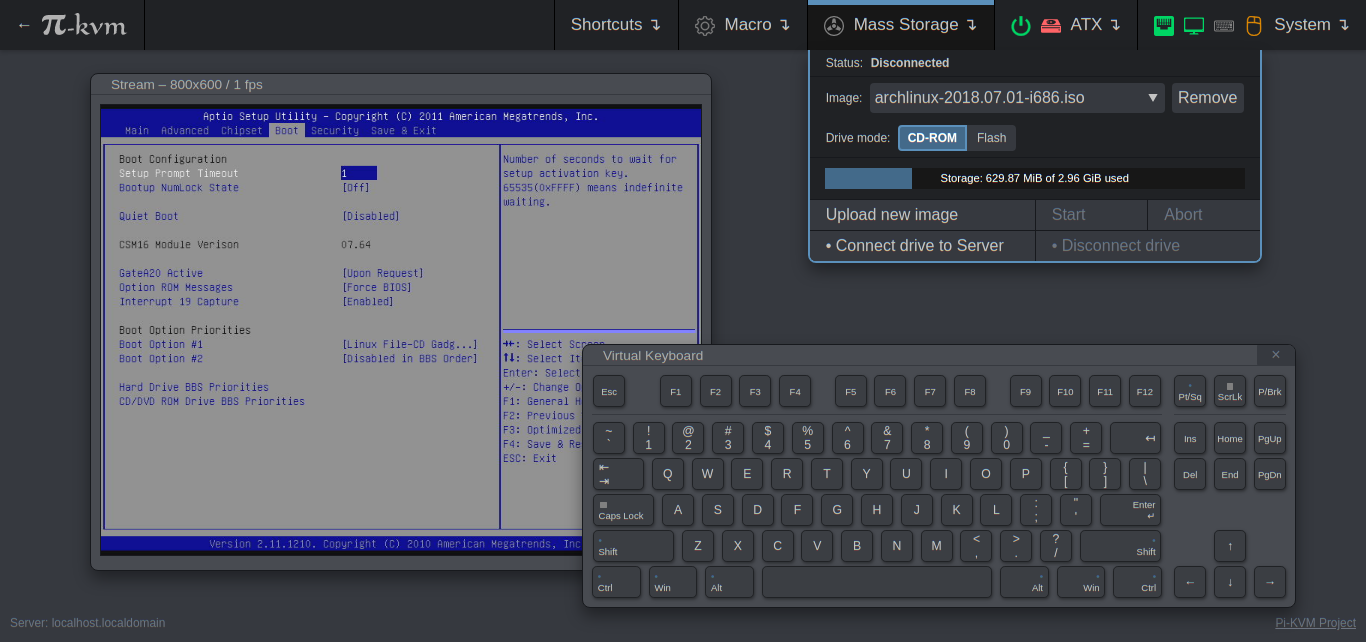
- Pi-KVM web interface
- Original author: Maxim Devaev
- Developer: Maxim Devaev
- Operating system: POSIX: GNU+Linux
- Platform: Raspberry Pi
- License: GPLv3
- Website: Official website
- Repository: github.com/pikvm

Pi-KVM is an open source project to provide a KVM over IP primarily based on the Raspberry Pi single-board computer.

== Software ==
The project consists of KVMd, the main Pi-KVM daemon using ustreamer as a multimedia streamer. It also provides a prebuilt OS image based on Arch Linux ARM.

The KVM interface can be accessed via numerous methods, including WebRTC in a modern Web browser, and optionally via VNC.

The architecture is permissive of tinkering and hacking, enabling users to devise their own solutions to unique problems or usage scenarios. For example, Pi-KVM includes SSH access by default, including root access. Thus, users may install additional software packages, reconfigure the system, add new features, or make whatever other changes, as they see fit.

The project has become mature enough that it's frequently deployed in mission critical enterprise environments. It either includes, or enables, methods of integration into enterprise infrastructure, such as centralised authentication, centralised logging and remote status & health monitoring.

== Hardware ==
More recently, the developers manufacture and sell fully-assembled, ready-to-deploy hardware, with Pi-KVM software pre-installed. Several models are available to suit different scenarios.

The developers report that they specified only high quality components, which respect users' rights and freedoms, such as by not sending ‘telemetry’ data back to their manufacturers.

However, DIY assembly of components is still enabled and supported by the project. Many users still opt for this approach. However, such DIY builds tend to be less featureful than Pi-KVM's hardware products.

Besides KVM control of a remote host, Pi-KVM's hardware products also include the means for ATX control of a remote computer. That is, physically interfacing with the computer's motherboard, via standardised components, in order to remotely receive the status of indicators for HDD activity and power, and to send button-presses for both power (either long or short duration) and reset buttons, so as to control the remote host's power state, including cold-booting it from a power-off state.

=== Multi-Channel Switch ===
Historically, a Pi-KVM device could enable remote access to only single computer. However, due to many users wanting to control multiple remote machines and several devising their own techniques of using third party KVM switches with Pi-KVM, as of 2025 Pi-KVM sells a multi-channel Switch device. Each Switch has 4 channels, yet they're also modular and so can be daisy-chained as needed with up to 5 Switches per Pi-KVM (a limitation of USB, rather than Pi-KVM itself). This enables a single Pi-KVM to access up to 20 remote hosts when using the maximum complement of Switches.

The Switches have many other features, including RGB indicator and/or beacon lights and ATX control, per channel. The KVMd software enables plug-and-play use of Switches, with several easy methods of commanding the Switches to access different remote hosts.

The Switch significantly lowers the cost-per-machine compared to using a separate Pi-KVM per machine.

Developers report that they're working on a rack-mountable version, which will enable accessing up to 64 remote hosts. Plans intend for this to be available perhaps by late 2026, or in 2027.
