= ESP Easy =

Open source micro-controller firmware

ESP Easy is a free and open source MCU firmware for the Internet of things (IoT). and originally developed by the LetsControlIt.com community (formerly known as ESP8266.nu community). It runs on ESP8266 Wi-Fi based MCU (microcontroller unit) platforms for IoT from Espressif Systems. The name "ESP Easy," by default, refers to the firmware rather than the hardware on which it runs. At a low level, the ESP Easy firmware works the same as the NodeMCU firmware and also provides a very simple operating system on the ESP8266. The main difference between ESP Easy firmware and NodeMCU firmware is that the former is designed as a high-level toolbox that just works out-of-the-box for a pre-defined set of sensors and actuators. Users simply hook up and read/control over simple web requests without having to write any code at all themselves, including firmware upgrades using OTA (Over The Air) updates.

The ESP Easy firmware can be used to turn modules using one of the many processors made by Espressif into simple multifunction sensor and actuator devices for home automation platforms. Once the firmware is loaded on the hardware, configuration of ESP Easy is entirely web interface based. ESP Easy firmware is primarily used on modules/hardware using one of the many Espressif manufactured processor as a wireless Wi-Fi sensor device with added sensors for temperature, humidity, barometric pressure, light intensity, etc. The ESP Easy firmware also offers some low-level actuator functions to control relays.

The firmware is built on the ESP8266 and ESP32 cores for Arduino which in turn uses many open source projects. Getting started with ESP Easy takes a few basic steps. In most cases, ESP8266 modules come with AT or NodeMCU LUA firmware, and you need to replace the existing firmware with the ESP Easy firmware by flashing the hardware with a (available on Windows, macOS and Linux platforms) flash tool to use it.

== Supported MCUs ==
ESPEasy can be used on a number of microprocessors made by Espressif:

- ESP8266
- ESP32 / ESP32-solo1
- ESP32-C2
- ESP32-C3
- ESP32-C6
- ESP32-S2
- ESP32-S3

== Related projects ==
- RPi-Easy Easy MultiSensor device running on Raspberry PI

=== ESP8266 Arduino Core ===
As Arduino.cc began developing new MCU boards based on non-AVR processors like the ARM/SAM MCU used in the Arduino Due, they needed to modify the Arduino IDE so that it would be relatively easy to support alternate toolchains to allow Arduino C/C++ to be compiled down to these new processors. They did this with the introduction of Boards Manager and the Arduino SAM Boards Core. A "core" is the collection of software components required by Boards Manager and the Arduino IDE to compile an Arduino C/C++ source file down to the target MCU's machine language.

== See also ==
- Home automation
- Web of Things
- Connected Device
- Smart device
