= List of Wi-Fi microcontrollers =

Wi-Fi microcontrollers enable Wi-Fi connectivity for devices so that they can send & receive data and accept commands. As such, Wi-Fi microcontrollers can be used for bringing otherwise ordinary devices into the realm of the Internet of things.

== List of Wi-Fi microcontroller chips ==
Manufacturer	Product name	Protocols	Processor	Flash memory	RAM memory	Package	URL
Cypress/Broadcom	CYW43340/BCM43340	IEEE 802.11a/b/g/n	ARM Cortex-M3	652 KiB	195 KiB	141-Ball WLBGA	CYW43340
Espressif	ESP8266, ESP8285	IEEE 802.11b/g/n	Tensilica Xtensa L106 (80 or 160 MHz)	ESP8266: External only (up to 4 MiB); ESP8285: Internal only (1 or 2 MiB)	64+96 KiB	QFN32	ESP8266; ESP8285
Espressif	ESP32	IEEE 802.11b/g/n	Tensilica Xtensa LX6 (240 MHz)	External only (up to 32 MiB)	320 KiB	QFN48	ESP32
iComm	SSV6060P	IEEE 802.11b/g/n	32-bit RISC microprocessor	?	?	QFN48	SSV6060P
MediaTek	MT7681	IEEE 802.11b/g/n	Andes N9 (80 MHz)	?	?	QFN40L	MT7681
MediaTek	MT7687	IEEE 802.11b/g/n	ARM Cortex-M4 (192 MHz)	2 MiB	256+96 KiB	QFN68	MT7687
Microchip	WFI32E01PC	single band IEEE 802.11b/g/n	PIC32MZ1025W104 (200 MHz)	1 MB	256 KB +64KB	module	WFI32E01PC
Microchip	ATSAMW25	IEEE 802.11b/g/n	ARM Cortex-M0+ (48 MHz)	256 KB	32 KB	module	ATSAMW25
Nufront	NL6621	IEEE 802.11b/g/n	ARM Cortex-M3 (160 MHz)	n/a	448 KiB	module	NL6621
MediaTek	MT7688	IEEE 802.11b/g/n	MIPS24KE (580 MHz)	?	?	DR-QFN156	Link
Realtek	RTL8195	IEEE 802.11b/g/n	ARM Cortex-M3 (166 MHz)	1 MiB	2.5 MiB	TFBGA-96	RTL8195AM
Realtek	RTL8711, RTL8710	IEEE 802.11b/g/n	ARM Cortex-M3 (166 MHz)	1 MiB	256 KiB	QFN32	RTL8710BN
Texas Instruments	CC3200, CC3220	IEEE 802.11b/g/n	ARM Cortex-M4 (80 MHz)	n/a, 1 MiB only in CC3220SF	128 or 256 KiB	QFN64	CC3200
Winner Micro	W600	IEEE 802.11 b/g/n	ARM Cortex-M3	1 MiB	288 KiB	QFN32	W600
