= CircuitPython =

Programming language for embedded electronics

- Logo of the Blinka library, a compatibility layer for CircuitPython
- Original author: Adafruit Industries
- Release: July 19, 2017; 9 years ago
- Stable release: 10.3.1 / 14 September 2026; 23 days ago
- Written in: C
- Platform: Supported microcontrollers and single-board computers
- Type: Python implementation
- License: MIT license
- Website: circuitpython.org
- Repository: github.com/adafruit/circuitpython

CircuitPython is an open-source derivative of the MicroPython programming language targeted toward students and beginners. Development of CircuitPython is supported by Adafruit Industries. It is a software implementation of the Python 3 programming language, written in C. It has been ported to run on several modern microcontrollers.

CircuitPython consists of a Python compiler to bytecode and a runtime interpreter of that bytecode that runs on the microcontroller hardware. The user is presented with an interactive prompt (the REPL) to execute supported commands immediately. Included are a selection of core Python libraries. CircuitPython includes modules which give the programmer access to the low-level hardware of supported products as well as higher-level libraries for beginners.

CircuitPython is a fork of MicroPython, originally created by Damien George. The MicroPython community continues to discuss forks of MicroPython into variants such as CircuitPython.

CircuitPython is targeted to be compatible with CPython, the reference implementation of the Python programming language. Programs written for CircuitPython-compatible boards may not run unmodified on other platforms such as the Raspberry Pi.

== Usage ==
CircuitPython is being used as an emerging alternative solution for microcontroller programming, which is usually done in C, C++, or assembly. The language has also seen uptake in making small, handheld video game devices. Developer Chris Young has ported his infrared transmit-and-receive software to CircuitPython to provide interactivity and to aid those with accessibility issues.

== Community ==
The user community support includes a Discord chat room and product support forums. A Twitter account dedicated to CircuitPython news was established in 2018. A newsletter, Python on Microcontrollers, is published weekly since 15 November 2016 by Adafruit to provide news and information on CircuitPython, MicroPython, and Python on single board computers. A Reddit subreddit, r/CircuitPython, provides news on CircuitPython and related news and projects and has about 4,300 members.

== Hardware support ==
As of July 6, 2025 version 9.2.8 supports over 608 different micro controller boards

The version 9.1.0 supports a range of platforms, called "ports":

- atmel-samd: Microchip SAMD21, SAMx5x
- cxd56: Sony Spresense
- espressif: Espressif ESP32, ESP32-S2, ESP32-S3, ESP32-C2, ESP32-C3, ESP32-C6
- Nordic: Nordic nRF52840, nRF52833
- raspberrypi: Raspberry Pi RP2040, RP2350
- stm: ST STM32F4 chip family

These ports are considered alpha and will have bugs and missing functionality:

- broadcom: Raspberry Pi boards such as RPi 4, RPi Zero 2W (bare metal)
- litex: fomu
- mimxrt10xx: NXP i.MX RT10xxx
- renode: hardware simulator
- silabs: Silicon Labs MG24 family
- stm: ST non-STM32F4 chip families

Previous versions supported the ESP8266 microcontroller, but its support was dropped in version 4.

=== Blinka Software Abstraction Layer ===
CircuitPython code may run on MicroPython or CPython using the Adafruit written Blinka compatibility layer. It acts as a translation layer between CircuitPython code and underlying code. This allows CircuitPython code to run on many more devices including a wide range of single-board computers which are listed on circuitpython.org. It is a pip installable Python library. The CircuitPython runtime is not used, as documented in the guide CircuitPython Libraries on Linux and Raspberry Pi.

=== Modules (Libraries) ===
Adafruit has fostered a community which has contributed software libraries for more than 488 sensors and drivers.
