= Another Tomorrow (company) =

American clothing retailer

- Company type: Private
- Industry: Retail, Fashion
- Founded: January 2018
- Founder: Vanessa Barboni Hallik
- Headquarters: New York City, United States
- Website: anothertomorrow.co

Another Tomorrow is a sustainable fashion clothing company headquartered in New York City. It uses a QR code technology for transparent supply chain information.

== Overview ==
Another Tomorrow was founded by Vanessa Barboni Hallik, a former managing director at Morgan Stanley. She hired Jane Chung, a former creative director at DKNY, as creative director of her company in June 2018. Together, they focused on sustainable and ethical development of apparel including raw material traceability to the farm level. Another Tomorrow was officially launched in 2020.

Another Tomorrow is a certified B Corporation that also maintains a digital platform for education and advocacy. The company uses organic cotton, organic linen, wool, FSC-certified viscose, recycled plastic and corozo in its clothing. It is also involved in re-commerce for sustainability. The company operates by selling clothing online, through its own website and other retail partners, along with its brick-and-mortar store in New York City. The company uses technology developed by Evrythng to digitize its supply chain into QR codes.

== Awards and recognition ==
Another Tomorrow has won Folio magazine’s 2020 Eddie and Ozzie Awards for their literature on ‘The Controversy Over Cotton’. The company was also recognized at the Fast Company’s 2020 Innovation by Design Awards in the fashion and beauty category.
