= Vlad Trifa =

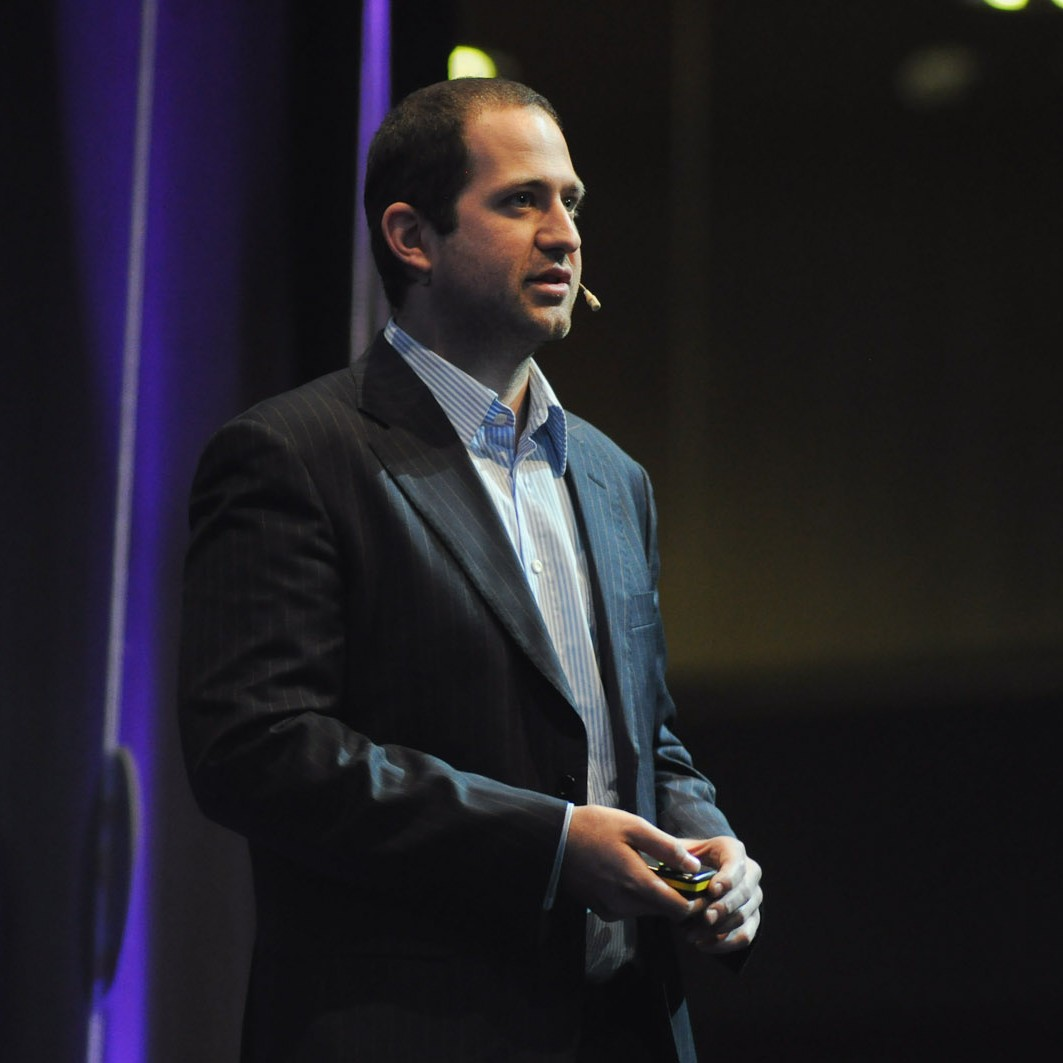
- Born: 12 March 1982 (age 44); Oradea, Romania
- Other name: Mihai Vlad Trifa
- Education: ETH Zurich
- Occupation: Computer scientist
- Employer: Swisscom
- Known for: pioneering the Web of Things, founding EVRYTHNG, contributing to Internet of Things standards
- Title: Ph.D. in Computer Science
- Website: http://vladtrifa.com/

Vlad Trifa is a computer scientist, researcher and Chief Product Officer at Ambrosus who played a key role in defining and implementing the application layer of the Internet of Things. He is particularly known for his early contributions to the Web of Things along with other researchers such as Dominique Guinard, Erik Wilde and Friedemann Mattern.

== Career ==
Vlad studied Computer Science at École Polytechnique Fédérale de Lausanne. He obtained his PhD in Computer Science at ETH Zurich. During his PhD he also worked as a Research Associate for SAP where he met Dominique Guinard. Both focused on the Internet of Things at SAP especially looking at the integration of real-world devices such as wireless sensor networks to business processes and enterprise software (e.g., ERPs). The complexity of these integrations at the time lead them to look simpler integration mechanisms. In 2007 they defined an application layer for the Internet of Things that uses Web standards called the Web of Things. Vlad wrote his Ph.D thesis on the Web of Things, particularly looking at the real-time aspects of Things on the Web. Towards the end of his Ph.D he experimented with applying the Web of Things concepts to smart cities and worked as a researcher in urban and mobile computing at SENSEable City Lab at MIT in Cambridge, USA and Singapore.

In 2011, Vlad co-founded EVRYTHNG together with Dominique Guinard, Niall Murphy and Andy Hobsbawm. The founding idea of EVRYTHNG was to create digital identities and Web APIs for all kinds of objects: from consumer goods to consumer electronics. As such EVRYTHNG was the first commercial Web of Things platform. Vlad served as the Chief Product Officer and then EVP of Research and Development at EVRYTHNG before joining Swisscom to lead the Swisscom Digital Lab at École Polytechnique Fédérale de Lausanne.

In 2015, Vlad co-authored the Web Thing Model which was accepted as an official W3C member submission. The Web Thing model is a first attempt at creating a simple Web based standard for the application layer of the Internet of Things.

== Publications ==
Vlad published a number of academic papers, largely related to the Internet of Things and the Web of Things. One of his most cited publications is "Towards the Web of Things: Web Mashups for Embedded Devices" which lays the foundations for integrating everyday devices and sensors to the Web. Vlad is also the co-author of Building the Web of Things, the first end to end manual for building Web connected devices.
