= Andy Hobsbawm =

British entrepreneur, writer and musician (born 1963)

- Born: Andrew John Hobsbawm; June 12, 1963 (age 62); London, England
- Occupations: Entrepreneur, writer, musician
- Known for: Co-founder of Online Magic, EVRYTHNG, Do The Green Thing
- Parent(s): Eric Hobsbawm (father); Marlene Schwartz (mother)

Andrew John Hobsbawm (born 12 June 1963) is an entrepreneur, writer and musician from London, England. He co-founded Online Magic, a British new media company, which was acquired by Omnicom in 1997. Hobsbawm is also a founder of EVRYTHNG and Do The Green Thing.

He is a member of the British Interactive Media Association’s Digital Hall of Fame.

== Early life ==
Andy Hobsbawm is the son of the historian Eric Hobsbawm and Marlene Hobsbawm (née Schwartz) in London, England. Hobsbawm attended sixth form college in Montreal, Canada, but did not go on to university to obtain a degree. He joined a rock band, Tin Gods, after leaving school.

== Career ==
While playing with Tin Gods, Hobsbawm responded to a newspaper ad soliciting entrepreneurs, which led to a position at magazine publisher APT Data. During his tenure there, Hobsbawm formed Internet Publishing with Eamonn Wilmott to develop the first European e-zine, PowerPC News.

Hobsbawm and Wilmott co-founded Online Magic, a leading British new media company in 1995. Online Magic became the first international web agency and developed the first website that covered a British general election, GE97. Omnicom’s Agency.com invested in Online Magic in 1997 and acquired it in 1998. Hobsbawm, who had served as president of Online Magic, was appointed Agency.com’s chief creative officer for Europe. Hobsbawm became chairman of Agency.com Europe in 2004. He left the company in 2009.

In 2007, Hobsbawm co-founded Do The Green Thing, a social networking site for encouraging people to lead greener lives, with Naresh Ramchandani. In 2008, Hobsbawm presented Do The Green Thing at TED in Monterey, California. His lecture was later included as a TEDTalk.

In 2011, Hobsbawm co-founded EVRYTHNG, a Web of Things software company.

== Bibliography ==
Hobsbawm has written articles for Forbes, the Financial Times and The Independent. He was also a weekly columnist on the new economy for the Financial Times. He is a co-author of The Economist’s Brands and Branding (ISBN 1576603504).

Hobsbawm has also written three white papers, entitled "10 years on: The State of the Internet a Decade after Mosaic", "Small is the Next Big Thing: The Size and Shape of Commerce and Culture" and "Product Relationship Management: Turning physical products into owned digital media."
