= Digimarc =

Technology company specializing in enterprise software and services

Digimarc Corporation
- Type: Public
- Traded as: Nasdaq: DMRC; Russell 2000 Component
- Industry: Technology
- Founded: 1995; 31 years ago
- Founder: Geoff Rhoads
- Headquarters: 8500 SW Creekside Pl Beaverton, Oregon, United States
- Area served: Worldwide
- Key people: Riley McCormack (CEO)
- Revenue: c. US$26.5 million (2021)
- Number of employees: 295
- Website: digimarc.com

Digimarc Corporation is a provider of enterprise software and services. The company's software, which includes digital identifiers (i.e., serialized QR codes and digital watermarks), is designed to address counterfeiting, product authenticity, recycling accuracy, and supply chain traceability. Digimarc products are created for multiple industries such as apparel, consumer packaged goods, health and beauty, and automotive.

With the 2022 acquisition of EVRYTHNG, a software company based in London, Digimarc added a digital product cloud to its roster of products.

== History ==
The company was founded by Geoff Rhoads in 1995.

In 1996, after initial venture funding, the company released its first product: a digital watermarking plug-in bundled with Adobe Photoshop, Corel and Micrografix software.

In 1997, Bruce Davis was appointed CEO and the company's first digital-watermarking patent was granted. Today, the company has nearly 1,100 innovations patented by the U.S. Patent and Trademark office.

In 1999, the company went public with an Initial Public Offering (IPO) which raised more than $90 million. That same year, the company contracted with a consortium of central banks to develop a global system used in deterring digital counterfeiting of currency.

In 2001, the company acquired a business division of Polaroid Corporation. Those assets led to the establishment of Digimarc ID Systems®, a division of the company that would eventually focus on protecting the authenticity of driver licenses in 37 states, which was sold off in 2008.

In 2004, the company was named one of the 25 fastest growing companies by Forbes magazine.

In 2015, the company received a Technology and Engineering Emmy Award for Steganographic Technologies for Audio/Video in the entertainment industry.

In 2017, the company was issued over 100+ new patents for innovations in watermark application and verification, augmented reality, and machine learning. That same year, the company opened offices in Cologne, Germany and Tokyo, Japan.

In 2021, CEO Bruce Davis retired and was succeeded by Riley McCormack who had previously served as Lead Director of the Digimarc Board. The company entered semi-industrial trials as part of the Digital Watermarks Initiative HolyGrail 2.0., an initiative that pulled together 100 companies focused on reducing plastic waste. In November, the company announced its plan to acquire EVRYTHNG, a software company based in London that specializes in providing products with a digital record on the web.

In 2022, the company's digital watermarks received a 99% detection rate during a semi-industrial trial as part of the HolyGrail 2.0 initiative.

== See also ==
- List of companies based in Oregon
