= Mongoose OS =

- Developer: Cesanta Software Ltd.
- Licence: Dual License: Apache License Version 2.0 and Commercial License.
- Website: mongoose-os.com

Mongoose OS is an Internet of Things (IoT) Firmware Development Framework available under Apache License Version 2.0. It supports low power, connected microcontrollers such as: ESP32, ESP8266, TI CC3200, TI CC3220, STM32 (STM32L4, STM32F4, STM32F7 series). Its purpose is to be a complete environment for prototyping, development and managing connected devices.

It is designed to reduce the time and costs associated with IoT projects.

Mongoose OS serves as the gap between Arduino firmware suitable for prototyping and bare-metal microcontrollers' native SDKs.

It is developed by Cesanta Software Ltd., a company based in Dublin (Ireland), and is dual licensed.

== Features ==
- Over the Air (OTA) updating of embedded ICs.
- Secure connectivity and crypto support
- Integrated Mongoose Web Server
- Programming in either JavaScript (integrated mJS engine) or C.
- Integration with private and public clouds: AWS IoT, Microsoft Azure IoT, Google IoT Core, IBM Watson IoT, Mosquitto, HiveMQ, etc.

== License ==
Mongoose OS is Open Source and dual-licensed:

- Mongoose OS Community Edition - Apache License Version 2.0
- Mongoose OS Enterprise Edition - Commercial License
