= RTL8710 =

Wi-Fi chip by Realtek

- Manufacturer: Realtek
- Type: Microcontroller
- CPU: ARM Cortex M3 @ 83 MHz (default) or 166 MHz
- Memory: 512KB RAM
- Storage: Integrated 1MB Flash
- Input: 16 GPIO pins
- Power: 3.3 VDC

The RTL8710 is a low-cost Wi-Fi chip with full TCP/IP stack and MCU (Micro Controller Unit) capability produced by Taiwanese manufacturer, Realtek.
