= EVRYTHNG =

British software company

- Type: Private
- Founded: January 2011; 15 years ago
- Founder: Niall Murphy, Andy Hobsbawm, Dominique Guinard, Vlad Trifa
- Headquarters: New York City, London and San Francisco
- Key people: Niall Murphy, Andy Hobsbawm, Dominique Guinard, Vlad Trifa
- Services: Internet of Things, Smart products, Product Relationship Management, Web of Things, Software, Sensors, Embedded Hardware and Software, Location-Based Services, NFC, QR Codes, RFID, Mobile,
- Website: evrythng.com

EVRYTHNG is an internet of things (IoT) software company based in London, with operations in Oregon, New York, Beijing, Minsk and Switzerland. The company delivers real-time data and actionable information about “smart products” featuring a digital identity in its EVRYTHNG Product Cloud, which connects consumer packaged goods to the web for business intelligence.

Niall Murphy, Andy Hobsbawm, Dominique Guinard and Vlad Trifa founded the company in January 2011. Murphy was the company's founding CEO. In 2022, EVRYTHNG was acquired by Digimarc, an Oregon-based company that specializes in digital watermarking and product digitization for brand integrity, traceability, sustainability and more.

== History ==
Niall Murphy, Andy Hobsbawm, Dominique Guinard and Vlad Trifa founded the company in January 2011. In November 2011, EVRYTHNG closed a $1 million seed funding round led by Atomico, a technology investment firm.

EVRYTHNG announced Diageo, a British alcoholic beverages company, as its first customer in October 2012. EVRYTHNG created a digital identity for Diageo's whiskey brands in Brazil, Chile, Venezuela, Australia, Eastern Europe and Vietnam.

In 2013, global analyst group Frost & Sullivan awarded EVRYTHNG's IoT platform a New Product Innovation Best Practice award.

In April 2014, EVRYTHNG secured US$7 million in a series-A investment round from Atomico, BHLP LLC, Dawn Capital and Cisco Investments. Later that year, the company received an undisclosed amount of funding from Samsung Ventures Investment Corporation. In 2014, EVRYTHNG received the best IoT start-up of the year recognition from The Europas, a subsidiary event from TechCrunch. The company was voted IoT Breakout Startup of the Year in 2014 and 2015 by Postcapes awards.

In March 2017, EVRYTHNG raised $24.8 million Series B round of funding. The Series B round was led by Sway Ventures and included participation from new investors BLOC Ventures and Generation Ventures.

EVRYTHNG was one of the first companies to support the GS1 Digital Link standard, upgrading the barcode and GTIN to a web address format, with the first iteration of the standard launched in 2018. EVRYTHNG co-founder and CTO Dom Guinard has co-chaired the GS1 Digital Link working group since its inception.

In 2019, Ralph Lauren became a customer of EVRYTHNG to digitize its product portfolio, rolling out the EVRYTHNG Product Cloud into all factories and across its product range.

EVRYTHNG was selected by the World Economic Forum as a Technology Pioneer in 2018. In 2020 the World Economic Forum named EVRYTHNG a Global Innovator. That same year, EVRYTHNG won Fast Company's World Changing Ideas Award.

In November 2021, EVRYTHNG announced it would be acquired by Digimarc. The acquisition was completed in January 2022. The combined company released the Digimarc Brand Integrity solution, featuring the EVRYTHNG Product Cloud for remote product authentication.
