= Tensilica =

Semiconductor company in California, US

Tensilica Inc.
- Type: Subsidiary
- Industry: Semiconductor intellectual property core
- Founded: 1997
- Fate: Acquired by Cadence Design Systems in 2013
- Headquarters: San Jose, California
- Key people: Chris Rowen, Jack Guedj
- Products: Microprocessors, HiFi audio, DSP cores
- Website: cadence.com

Tensilica Inc. was a company based in Silicon Valley that developed semiconductor intellectual property (SIP) cores. Tensilica was founded in 1997 by Chris Rowen. In April 2013, the company was acquired by Cadence Design Systems for approximately $326 million.

== Products ==
Cadence Tensilica develops SIP blocks to be included in chip (IC) designs of products of its licensees, such as system on a chip architectures for embedded systems. Tensilica processors are delivered as synthesizable RTL to aid integration with other designs.

=== Xtensa configurable cores ===
Xtensa processors range from small, low-power cache-less microcontroller to more performance-oriented SIMD processors, multiple-issue VLIW DSP cores, and neural network processors. Cadence standard DSPs are based on the Xtensa architecture. The architecture offers a user-customizable instruction set through automated customization tools that can extend the base instruction set, including and not limited to, addition of new SIMD instructions and register files.

==== Xtensa instruction set ====
The Xtensa instruction set is a 32-bit architecture with a compact 16- and 24-bit instruction set. The base instruction set has 82 RISC instructions and includes a 32-bit ALU, 16 general-purpose 32-bit registers, and one special-purpose register.

=== Audio and voice DSP IP ===
Simplified block diagrams of HiFi audio engine and Xtensa LX

- HiFi Mini Audio DSP — A small low power DSP core for voice triggering and voice recognition
- HiFi 2 Audio DSP — DSP core for low power MP3 audio processing
- HiFi EP Audio DSP — A superset of HiFi 2 with optimizations for DTS Master Audio, voice pre- and post-processing, and cache management
- HiFi 3 Audio DSP — 32-bit DSP for audio enhancement algorithms, wideband voice codecs, and multi-channel audio
- HiFi 3z Audio DSP — For lower-powered audio, wideband voice codecs, and neural-network-based speech recognition.
- HiFi 4 DSP - Higher performance DSP for applications such as multi-channel object-based audio standards.
- HiFi 5 DSP - For digital assistants, infotainment, and voice-controlled products.

=== Vision DSPs ===
- Vision P5 and P6 DSP.
- Vision C5 DSP, for neural network computational tasks.

=== Adoption ===
- AMD TrueAudio, available in select GPU products based on the GCN2 microarchitecture, integrates an HiFi EP Audio DSP on-die. Hardware integration of the DSP is dropped since GCN4, with TrueAudio Next switching to a GPGPU-based approach.
- Microsoft HoloLens incorporates a custom coprocessor fabricated on TSMC's 28nm process node, integrating 24 Tensilica DSP cores. It has around 65 million logic gates, 8 MB of SRAM, and 1 GB of low-power DDR3 RAM.
- Espressif ESP8266 and ESP32 Wi-Fi IoT SoCs use respectively the "Diamond Standard 106Micro" (by Espressif referred to as "L106") and the LX6.
- Spreadtrum, licensing the HiFi DSP.
- VIA Technologies, using the HiFi DSP in an embedded SoC.
- Realtek standardized on the HiFi audio DSP for mobile and PC products.

== History ==
- In 1997, Tensilica was founded by Chris Rowen.
- Five years later, Tensilica released support for flexible length instruction encodings, known as FLIX.
- By 2013, Cadence Design Systems acquired 100% of Tensilica.

== Company name ==
The brand name Tensilica is a combination of the word Tensile and Silica, with the latter referring to silicon, the base material of most modern integrated circuits.
