= Connected Devices =

Connected devices may refer to:

- Smart device, an autonomous electronic device that may be connect to others in a network
- Mobile device, a computing device typically small enough to be handheld
  - Mobile Internet device, a multimedia-capable mobile device providing wireless Internet access
- Wearable computer, also known as body-borne computer or wearable, a smart device worn like clothing or jewelry
