= ESP8266 =

System-on-a-chip microcontroller model with Wi-Fi

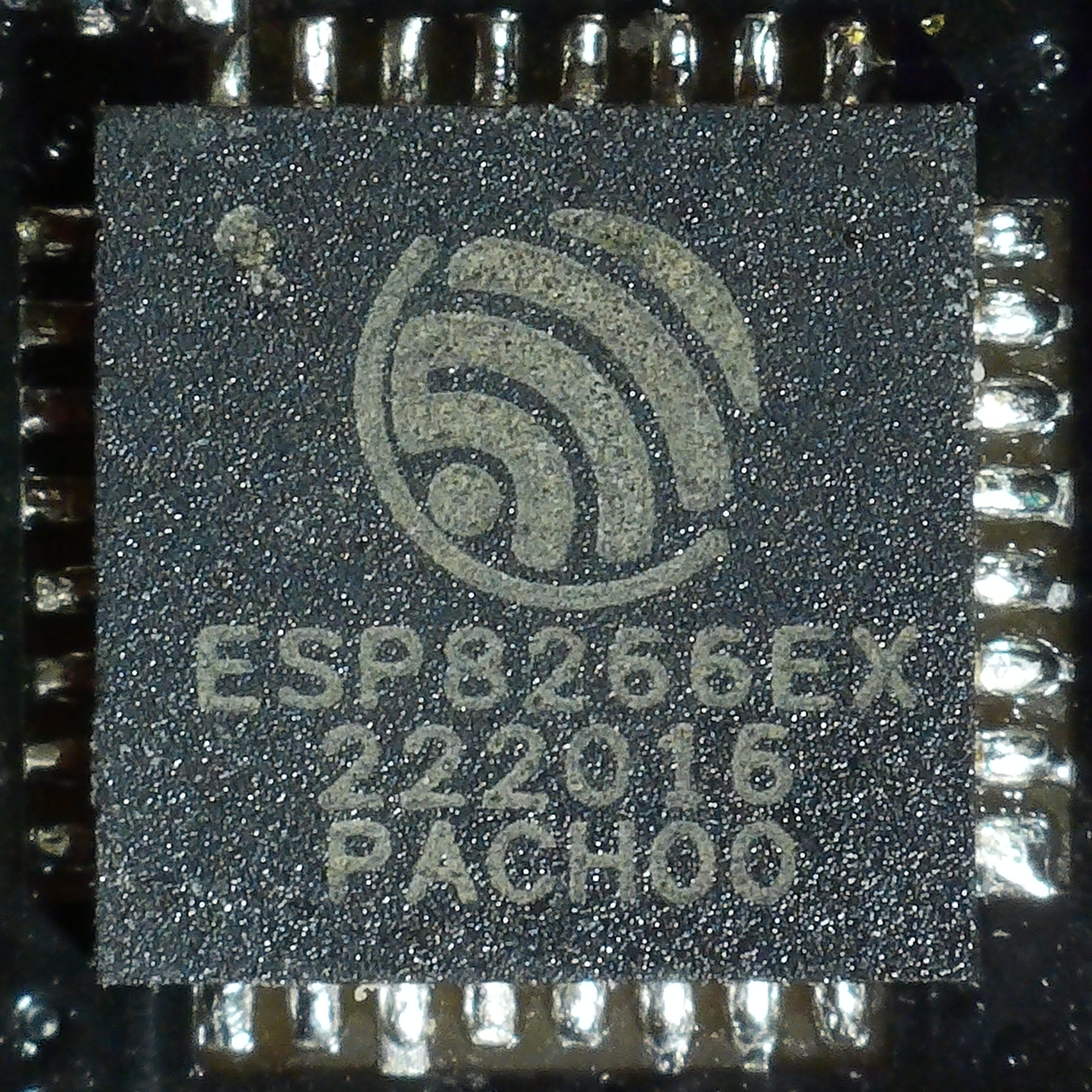
- ESP8266-IC
- Manufacturer: Espressif Systems
- Type: 32-bit microcontroller
- CPU: Tensilica Diamond Standard 106Micro (aka. L106) @ 80 MHz (default) or 160 MHz
- Memory: 32 KiB instruction, 80 KiB user data
- Input: 16 GPIO pins
- Power: 3.3 V DC
- Successor: ESP32

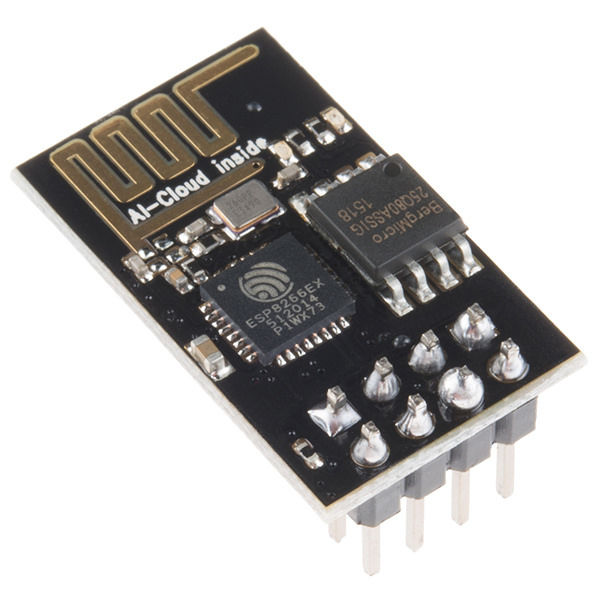
ESP-01 module by Ai-Thinker with ESP8266EX SoC

The ESP8266 is a low-cost Wi-Fi microchip, with built-in TCP/IP networking software, and microcontroller capability, produced by Espressif Systems in Shanghai, China.

The chip was popularized in the English-speaking maker community in August 2014 via the ESP-01 module, made by a third-party manufacturer Ai-Thinker. This small module allows microcontrollers to connect to a Wi-Fi network and make simple TCP/IP connections using Hayes-style commands. However, at first, there was almost no English-language documentation on the chip and the commands it accepted. The very low price and the fact that there were very few external components on the module, which suggested that it could eventually be very inexpensive in volume, attracted many hackers to explore the module, the chip, and the software on it, as well as to translate the Chinese documentation.

The ESP8285 is a similar chip with a built-in 1 MiB flash memory, allowing the design of single-chip devices capable of connecting via Wi-Fi.

These microcontroller chips have been succeeded by the ESP32 family of devices.

== Features ==
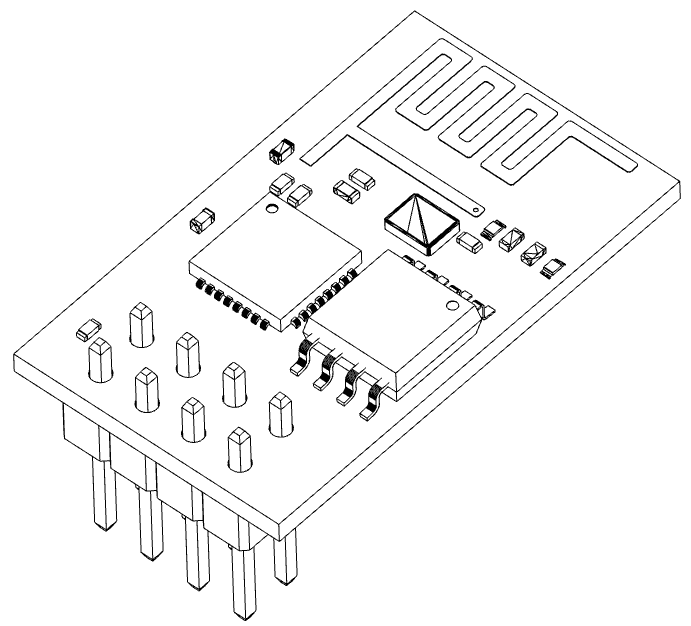
ESP-01 module wireframe drawing

- Processor: L106 32-bit RISC microprocessor core based on the Tensilica Diamond Standard 106Micro running at 80 or 160 MHz far from the 240 MHz of a ESP32
- Memory of 160 Kbytes of RAM which are segmented into:
  - 32 KB instruction RAM (iRAM)
  - 32 KB instruction cache RAM
  - 96 KB of dRAM which are segmented into 80 KB dRAM for SDK and heap memory, and 16 KB for ROM
- External QSPI flash: up to 16 MiB is supported (512 KiB to 4 MiB typically included)
- IEEE 802.11 b/g/n Wi-Fi
  - Integrated TR switch, balun, LNA, power amplifier and matching network
  - WEP or WPA/WPA2 authentication, or open networks
- 17 GPIO pins
- Serial Peripheral Interface Bus (SPI)
- I²C (software implementation)
- I²S interfaces with DMA (sharing pins with GPIO)
- UART on dedicated pins, plus a transmit-only UART can be enabled on GPIO2
- 10-bit ADC (successive approximation ADC)

== Pinout of ESP-01 ==
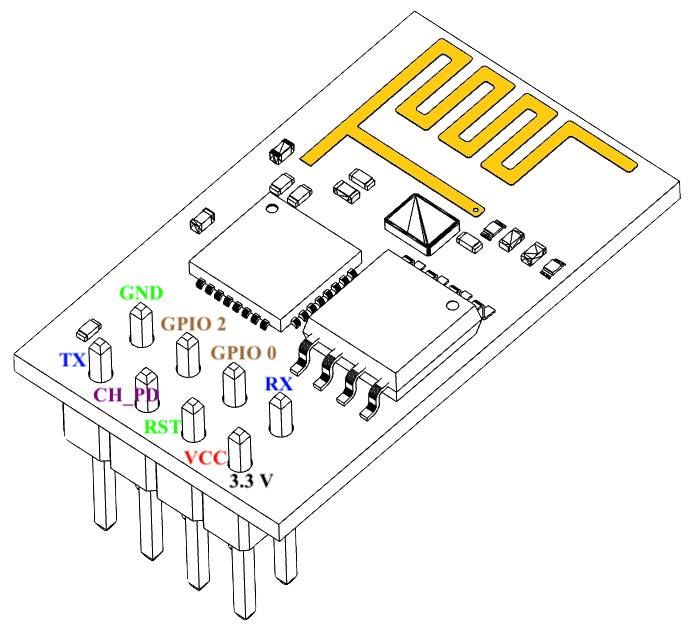
ESP-01 module pinout

The pinout is as follows for the common ESP-01 module:

1. GND, Ground (0 V)
2. GPIO 2, General-purpose input/output No. 2
3. GPIO 0, General-purpose input/output No. 0
4. RX, Receive data in, also GPIO3
5. VCC, Voltage (+3.3 V; can handle up to 3.6 V)
6. RST, Reset
7. CH_PD, Chip power-down
8. TX, Transmit data out, also GPIO1

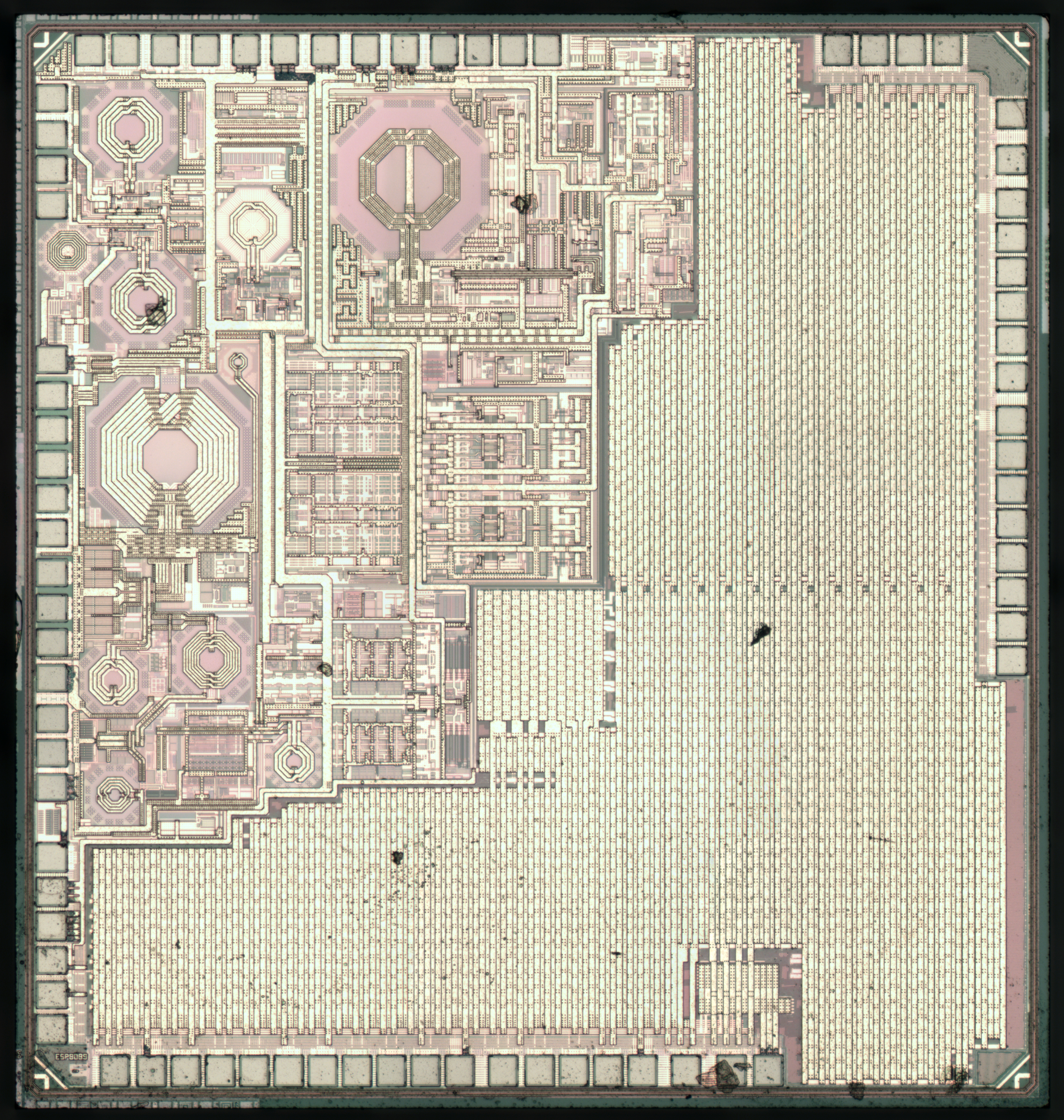
ESP8266 Die shot

== SDKs ==
In October 2014, Espressif Systems released a software development kit (SDK) for programming the chip directly, which removed the need for a separate microcontroller. Since then, there have been many official SDK releases from Espressif; Espressif maintains two versions of the SDK — one that is based on FreeRTOS and the other based on callbacks.

An alternative to Espressif's official SDK is the open-source ESP-Open-SDK that is based on the GNU Compiler Collection (GCC) toolchain, maintained by Max Filippov. Another alternative is the "Unofficial Development Kit" by Mikhail Grigorev.

Other SDKs, mostly open-source, include:

- Arduino — A C++-based firmware. With this core, the ESP8266 CPU and its Wi-Fi components can be programmed like any other Arduino device. The ESP8266 Arduino Core is available through GitHub.
- ESP8266 BASIC — An open-source BASIC-like interpreter specifically tailored for the Internet of Things (IoT). Self-hosting browser-based development environment.
- ESP Easy — Developed by home automation enthusiasts.
- ESPHome — ESPHome is a system to control your ESP8266/ESP32 by simple yet powerful configuration files and control them remotely through home automation systems.
- Tasmota - open-source firmware, for home automation.
- ESP-Open-RTOS — Open-source FreeRTOS-based ESP8266 software framework.
- ESP-Open-SDK — Free and open (as much as possible) integrated SDK for ESP8266/ESP8285 chips.
- Espruino — An actively maintained JavaScript SDK and firmware, closely emulating Node.js. Supports a few MCUs, including the ESP8266.
- ESPurna — Open-source ESP8285/ESP8266 firmware.
- Forthright — Port of Jones Forth to the ESP8266 microcontroller.
- MicroPython — A port of MicroPython (an implementation of Python for embedded devices) to the ESP8266 platform.
- Moddable SDK — includes JavaScript language and library support for the ESP8266
- Mongoose OS — An open-source operating system for connected products. Supports ESP8266 and ESP32. Develop in C or JavaScript.
- NodeMCU — A Lua-based firmware.
- PlatformIO — A cross-platform IDE and unified debugger, which sits on top of Arduino code and libraries.
- Punyforth — Forth-inspired programming language for the ESP8266.
- Sming — An actively developed asynchronous C/C++ framework with superb performance and multiple network features.
- uLisp — A version of the Lisp programming language specifically designed to run on processors with a limited amount of RAM.
- ZBasic for ESP8266 — A subset of Microsoft's widely-used Visual Basic 6, which has been adapted as a control language for the ZX microcontroller family and the ESP8266.
- Zerynth — IoT framework for programming ESP8266 and other microcontrollers in Python.
- IOTBAH - is An operating system (OS) for Espressif ESP8266
- EspOS Webserver, easy IoT solution.

== Espressif modules ==
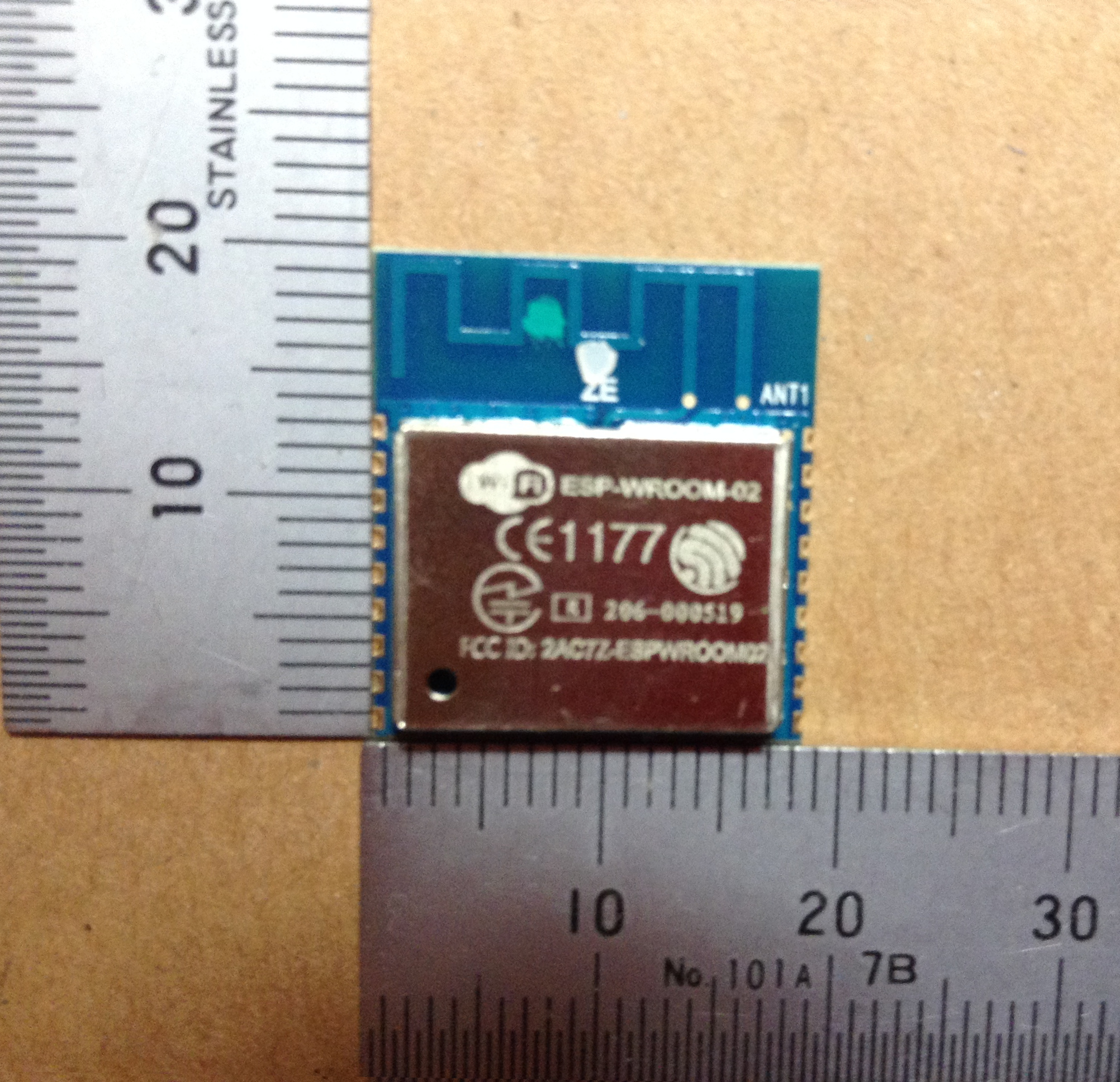
ESP-WROOM-02

This is the series of ESP8266-based modules made by Espressif:

Name	Active pins	Pitch	Form factor	LEDs	Antenna	Shielded	Dimensions (mm)	Notes
ESP-WROOM-02	18	1.5 mm	2×9 castellated	No	PCB trace	Yes	18 × 20	FCC ID 2AC7Z-ESPWROOM02.
ESP-WROOM-02D	18	1.5 mm	2×9 castellated	No	PCB trace	Yes	18 × 20	FCC ID 2AC7Z-ESPWROOM02D. Revision of ESP-WROOM-02 compatible with both 150-mil and 208-mil flash memory chips.
ESP-WROOM-02U	18	1.5 mm	2×9 castellated	No	U.FL socket	Yes	18 × 20	Differs from ESP-WROOM-02D in that includes an U.FL compatible antenna socket connector.
ESP-WROOM-S2	20	1.5 mm	2×10 castellated	No	PCB trace	Yes	16 × 23	FCC ID 2AC7Z-ESPWROOMS2.

In the table above (and the two tables which follow), "Active pins" include the GPIO and ADC pins with which external devices can be attached to the ESP8266 MCU. The "Pitch" is the space between pins on the ESP8266 module, which is important to know if the device will be used on a breadboard. The "Form factor" also describes the module packaging as "2 × 9 DIL", meaning two rows of 9 pins arranged "Dual In Line", like the pins of DIP ICs. Many ESP-xx modules include a small onboard LED which can be programmed to blink and thereby indicate activity. There are several antenna options for ESP-xx boards including a trace antenna, an onboard ceramic antenna, and an external connector that allows an external Wi-Fi antenna to be attached. Since Wi-Fi communications generate a lot of RFI (Radio Frequency Interference), governmental bodies like the FCC like shielded electronics to minimize interference with other devices. Some of the ESP-xx modules come housed within a metal box with an FCC seal of approval stamped on it. First and second world markets will likely demand FCC approval and shielded Wi-Fi devices.

== Ai-Thinker modules ==
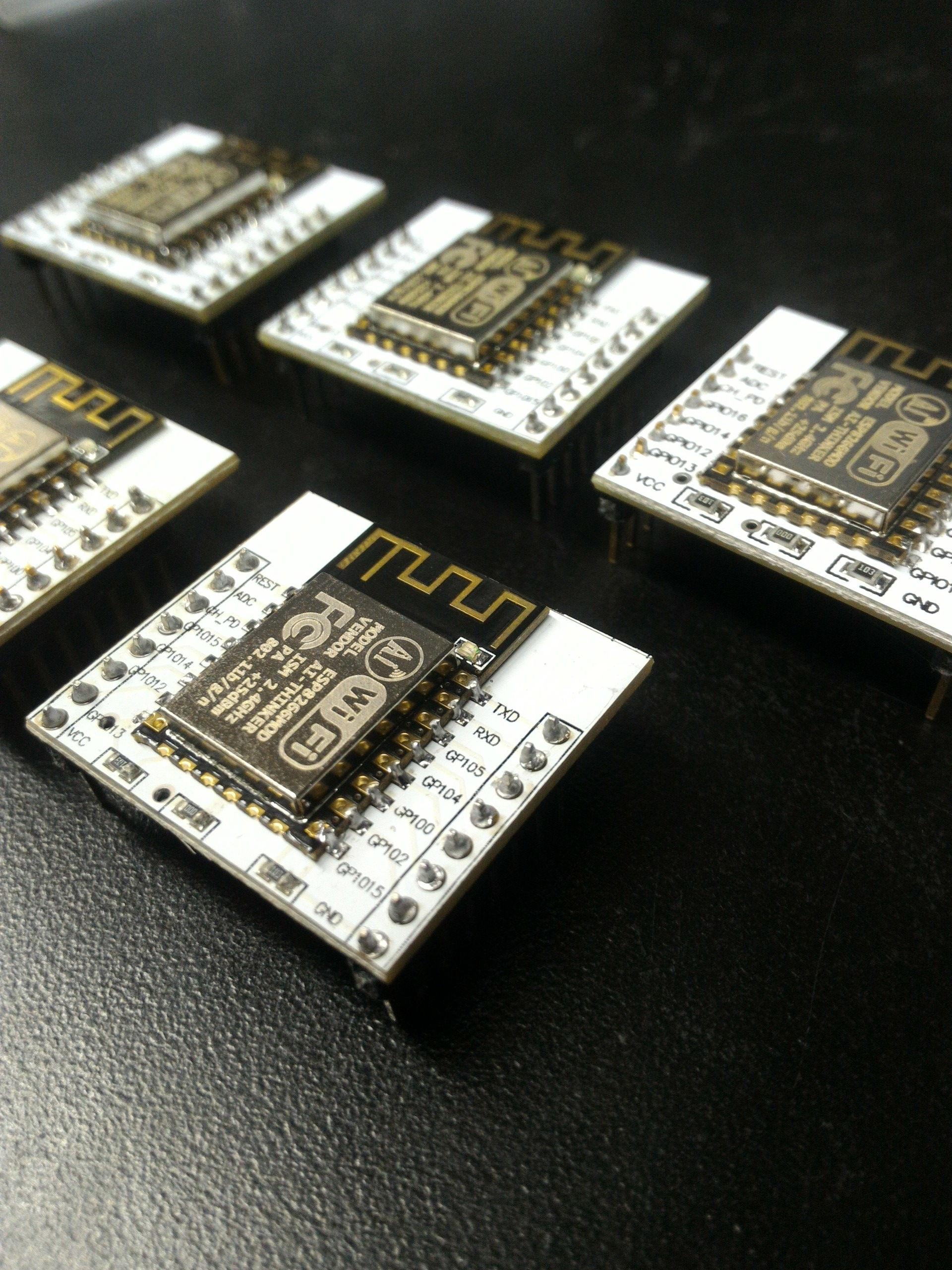
Ai-Thinker ESP8266 modules (ESP-12F, black color) soldered to breakout boards (white color)

This is the first series of modules made with the ESP8266 by the third-party manufacturer Ai-Thinker and remains the most widely available. They are collectively referred to as "ESP-xx modules". To form a workable development system, they require additional components, especially a serial TTL-to-USB adapter (sometimes called a USB-to-UART bridge) and an external 3.3 volt power supply. Novice ESP8266 developers are encouraged to consider larger ESP8266 Wi-Fi development boards like the NodeMCU which includes the USB-to-UART bridge and a Micro-USB connector coupled with a 3.3 volt power regulator already built into the board. When project development is complete, those components are not needed and these cheaper ESP-xx modules are a lower power, smaller footprint option for production runs.

In the Notes column, Flash memory sizes apply to the given module and all those below it in the table. Exceptions which apply to a single module are shown in ().

Name	Active pins	Pitch	Form factor	LEDs	Antenna	Shielded	Dimensions (mm)	Notes
ESP-01	6	0.1 in	2×4 DIL	Yes	PCB trace	No	14.3 × 24.8	512 KiB Flash and blue PCB from a generic manufacturer. 1 MiB Flash, AI-Cloud and black PCB from AI-Thinker.
ESP-01S	6	0.1 in	2×4 DIL	Yes	PCB trace	No	14.4 × 24.7	1 MiB Flash
ESP-01M	16	1.6 mm	2×9 edge connector	No	PCB trace	Yes	18.0 × 18.0	Uses ESP8285 (1 MiB built-in flash).
ESP-02	6	0.1 in	2×4 castellated	No	U.FL socket	No	14.2 × 14.2	
ESP-03	10	2 mm	2×7 castellated	No	Ceramic	No	17.3 × 12.1	
ESP-04	10	2 mm	2×4 castellated	No	None	No	14.7 × 12.1	
ESP-05	3	0.1 in	1×5 SIL	No	U.FL socket	No	14.2 × 14.2	
ESP-06	11	various	4×3 dice	No	None	Yes	14.2 × 14.7	Not FCC approved.
ESP-07	14	2 mm	2×8 pinhole	Yes	Ceramic + U.FL socket	Yes	20.0 × 16.0	Not FCC approved.
ESP-07S	14	2 mm	2×8 pinhole	No	U.FL socket	Yes	17.0 × 16.0	FCC and CE approved.
ESP-08	10	2 mm	2×7 castellated	No	None	Yes	17.0 × 16.0	Not FCC approved.
ESP-09	10	various	4×3 dice	No	None	No	10.0 × 10.0	
ESP-10	3	2 mm	1×5 castellated	No	None	No	14.2 × 10.0	
ESP-11	6	1.27 mm	1×8 pinhole	No	Ceramic	No	17.3 × 12.1	
ESP-12	14	2 mm	2×8 castellated	Yes	PCB trace	Yes	24.0 × 16.0	FCC and CE approved.
ESP-12E	20	2 mm	2×8 castellated	Yes	PCB trace	Yes	24.0 × 16.0	4 MiB flash.
ESP-12F	20	2 mm	2×8 castellated	Yes	PCB trace	Yes	24.0 × 16.0	FCC and CE approved. Improved antenna performance.
ESP-12S	14	2 mm	2×8 castellated	Yes	PCB trace	Yes	24.0 × 16.0	FCC approved.
ESP-13	16	1.5 mm	2×9 castellated	No	PCB trace	Yes	W18.0 × L20.0	Marked as "FCC". Shielded module is placed sideways, as compared to the ESP-12 modules.
ESP-14	22	2 mm	2×8 castellated +6	Yes	PCB trace	Yes	24.3 × 16.2	Mostly advertised with "AI Cloud Inside".

== Other boards ==
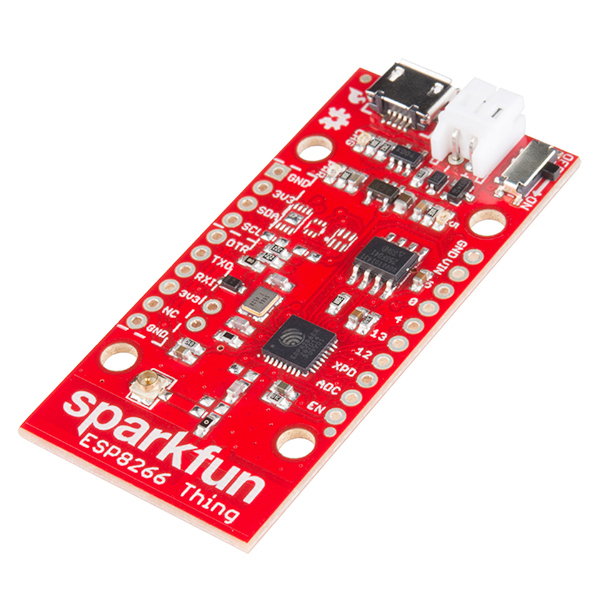
SparkFun ESP8266 Thing

The reason for the popularity of many of these boards over the earlier ESP-xx modules is the inclusion of an on-board USB-to-UART bridge (like the Silicon Labs' CP2102 or the WCH CH340G) and a Micro-USB connector, coupled with a 3.3-volt regulator to provide both power to the board and connectivity to the host (software development) computer – commonly referred to as the console, making it an easy development platform. With earlier ESP-xx modules, these two items (the USB-to-serial adapter and the regulator) had to be purchased separately and be wired into the ESP-xx circuit. Modern ESP8266 boards like the NodeMCU are easier to work with and offer more GPIO pins. Most of the boards listed here are based on the ESP-12E module, but new modules are being introduced seemingly every few months.

Name	Active pins	Pitch	Form factor	LEDs	Antenna	Shielded	Dimensions (mm)	Notes
Bolt IoT	14	0.1 in	2×14 DIL	Yes	PCB trace	Yes	30 × 40	Comes with an onboard SD card and features like Lib-Discovery and Fail Safe Mode. Has its own cloud for IoT.
Olimex MOD-WIFI-ESP8266	2	0.1 in	UEXT module	Yes	PCB trace	No	?	Only RX/TX are connected to UEXT connector.
Olimex MOD-WIFI-ESP8266-DEV	20	0.1 in	2×11 DIL + castellated	Yes	PCB trace	No	33 × 23	All available GPIO pins are connected, also has pads for soldering UEXT connector (with RX/TX and SDA/SCL signals).
NodeMCU DEVKIT	14	0.1 in	2×15 DIL	Yes	PCB trace	Yes	49 × 24.5	Uses the ESP-12 module; includes USB to serial interface.
Adafruit Huzzah ESP8266 breakout	14	0.1 in	2×10 DIL	Yes	PCB trace	Yes	25 × 38	Uses the ESP-12 module.
SparkFun ESP8266 Thing WRL-13231	12	0.1 in	2×10 DIL	Yes	PCB trace + U.FL socket	No	58 × 26	FTDI serial header, Micro-USB socket for power, includes Li-ion battery charger.
KNEWRON Technologies smartWIFI	12	0.1 in	2×20 DIL	Yes 1 RGB	PCB trace	Yes	25.4 × 50.8	CP2102 USB bridge, includes battery charger, micro-USB socket for power and battery charging, 1 RGB LED and USER / Reflash button.
ArduCAM ESP8266 UNO	12+	0.1 in	Arduino Uno	Yes	PCB trace	Yes	53.4 × 68.6	Uses the AI Thinker's ESP8266MOD module and features Micro-USB port, Battery pins, Camera pins and uSD card all on the same board. Fully compatible with Arduino Uno shields.
DoIT ESPduino	12	0.1 in	Arduino Uno	Yes	PCB trace	Yes	53.4 × 68.6	Uses the ESP-WROOM-02 (ESP-13) module and USB Type B port. Fully compatible with Arduino Uno shields.
WeatherPlus - SwitchDoc Labs	26+Grove	0.1 in	Custom	Yes	PCB trace	Yes	86.0 × 50.0	Uses the AI Thinker Model ESP8266MOD (ESP-13) module and FTDI for Programming and Mini-USB port for power. Fully compatible with Adafruit Huzzah software. Includes BMP280 Barometer, ADS1115 and Grove I2C connectors. Plugs for Anemometer/Wind Vane/Rain Bucket.
WeMos D1	12	0.1 in	Arduino Uno	Yes	PCB trace	Yes	53.4 × 68.6	Uses the ESP-12F module and Micro-USB socket. Discontinued in favor of WeMos D1 R2.
WeMos D1 R2	12	0.1 in	Arduino Uno	Yes	PCB trace	Yes	53.4 × 68.6	Uses ESP-12F module and has Micro-USB socket.
WeMos D1 mini	12	0.1 in	2×8 DIL	Yes	PCB trace	Yes	25.6 × 34.2	Uses ESP-12S module and has Micro-USB socket.
WeMos D1 mini Lite	12	0.1 in	2×8 DIL	Yes	PCB trace	Yes	25.6 × 34.2	Based on the ESP8285, an ESP8266 with 1 MiB flash built-in; has Micro-USB socket.
WeMos D1 mini Pro	12	0.1 in	2×8 DIL	Yes	Ceramic and U.FL socket	Yes	25.6 × 34.2	Uses ESP8266EX chip; has Micro-USB socket, U.FL antenna connector, and 16 MiB flash.
ESPert ESPresso Lite	16	0.1 in	2×8 DIL	Yes	PCB trace	Yes	26.5 × 57.6	Uses the ESP-WROOM-02 module. Produced in limited quantity as beta version.
ESPert ESPresso Lite V2.0	24	0.1 in	2×10 DIL	Yes	PCB trace	Yes	28 × 61	Improved version of ESPresso Lite.
In-Circuit ESP-ADC	18	0.1 in	2×9 DIL	No	U.FL socket	Yes	22.9 × 14.9	Uses ESP8266EX chip.
Watterott ESP-WROOM02-Breakout	14	0.1 in	2×10 DIL	Yes	PCB trace	Yes	40.64 × 27.94	Uses the Espressif ESP-WROOM-02 module.
Geek Wave Solution IOT WROOM-02 Dev. Board	20	0.1 in	?	Yes	PCB trace	Yes	93.80 × 80.02	Development board with Espressif ESP-WROOM-02 module and four relays.
Witty 2-piece board	20	0.1 in	?	Yes	PCB trace	Yes	?	Development board with Espressif ESP8266 ESP-12E and separate board for CH340G USB interface.

== ESP32-C3 ==
In 2020, Espressif announced a new chip, ESP32-C3, which is pin-compatible with ESP8266. It is based on a single core RISC-V 32-bit CPU with a clock speed of up to 160 MHz. It includes 400 KiB of SRAM and 384 KiB ROM storage space built in.

== See also ==
- ESP32 – the successor product from Espressif
- Internet of things
- MCU (microcontroller unit)
