= Espressif Systems =

Chinese Semiconductor Company

Espressif Systems (Shanghai) Co., Ltd.
- Trade name: Espressif
- Native name: 乐鑫信息科技(上海)股份有限公司
- Type: Public
- Traded as: SSE: 688018
- Industry: Semiconductors
- Founded: April 28, 2008; 18 years ago
- Founder: Teo Swee Ann
- Headquarters: Shanghai, China
- Key people: Teo Swee Ann (Chairman & CEO)
- Revenue: ▲CN¥1.43 billion (2023)
- Net income: ▲CN¥136.20 million (2023)
- Total assets: ▲CN¥2.20 billion (2023)
- Total equity: ▲CN¥1.91 billion (2023)
- Number of employees: 625 (2023)
- Website: www.espressif.com

Espressif Systems (Shanghai) Co., Ltd. (Espressif; Chinese: 乐鑫科技; pinyin: Lèxīn Kējì) is a publicly listed Chinese semiconductor company headquartered in Shanghai. It focuses on developing and selling wireless microcontroller unit communication chips and modules that are used in internet of things (IoT).

== History ==
In 2008, Espressif was founded in China by Singaporean national Teo Swee Ann. Before founding Espressif, Teo worked for Montage Technology as an engineering director, having previously graduated with a degree in electrical engineering from National University of Singapore.

Espressif initially started as one-man consulting firm. It had initial difficulty getting foundries to manufacture its chips due to the small quantity commissioned. However, TSMC, who had heard of Teo's work at Montage Technology, began to manufacture its designs.

On 22 July 2019, Espressif had its initial public offering and became a listed company on the Shanghai Stock Exchange STAR Market. The offering raised 1.2 billion yuan.

In March 2022, it was reported that Espressif was moving exclusively to the RISC-V open source instruction set architecture.

As of September 2023, Espressif had shipped over 1 billion IoT chips and is the fifth largest company in the Wi-Fi microcontroller business.

== Business operations ==
Since establishment, Espressif has remained profitable. Rather than buying existing solutions which is a standard practice in the chip industry, Espressif performs its own engineering and has a cost effective method of designing chips. Managers and directors are expected to do coding in addition to their managerial duties.

Espressif's sales model consists primarily of direct sales, supplemented by distribution.

== Products ==
Espressif has established itself in providing Wi-Fi and Bluetooth-integrated devices and solutions. Initially focusing on Wi-Fi microcontrollers, the company has expanded into the fields artificial intelligence of things and system on a chip.

Two of Espressif's most well known semiconductor products are the ESP8266 and its successor, the ESP32. They are used in products such as coffee machines and light bulbs, as well as by providers of smart city and automation solutions. They are also used by DIY tech hobbyists.

== See also ==
- Semiconductor industry in China
