= Largan Precision =

Taiwanese electronics company

Largan Precision Company Limited 大立光電股份有限公司
- Company type: Public limited (TWSE: 3008)
- Industry: Electronic components
- Founded: 1987
- Key people: Co-Founders: Tony Chen and Scott Lin
- Products: Camera modules
- Net income: US$941.75 million (2019)
- Number of employees: 2,576 (Sept 2012)
- Website: www.largan.com.tw/

Largan Precision Company Limited or Largan Precision (Chinese: 大立光電股份有限公司) is a Taiwanese company with its headquarters in Nantun District, Taichung City. The company manufactures optical lens modules and optoelectronic components, which are mainly used in scanners, cameras, digital cameras, multi function product, LCD projectors, phone lenses, rear projection TVs, and optical mice.

Largan Precision is the world's biggest supplier of smartphone camera lenses and accounts for 30 percent of the global market share. It is one of the "nation's biggest supplier" for iPhone camera lenses along with Foxconn Interconnect Technology and Guangyao Technology.

== History ==
The company was founded in 1987 by Tony Chen and Scott Lin and went public on the Taiwan Stock Exchange on 11 March 2002.

Scott Lin, one of the co-founders, took the suggestion of his friend Jong Huang, Chairman of Premier Technology, to try to shift the production focus to lighter and thinner lenses instead of glass lenses, which are comparatively heavier and thicker, becoming a significant Apple Inc. components supplier.

In 2001, the company was certified as compliant with ISO 9001. It was merged with Largan Optronic Co., Ltd. A year later, Largan Precision went public on Taiwan Stock Exchange (TWSE). They developed a projector zoom lens, a VGA lens used in mobile phones, and 3.0 Megapixels 3x zoom digital camera lens. At that time, the company was ranked #2 by profit rate, #92 by net profit after tax, and #141 by revenue growth rate.

As of 2016, Largan Precision is headquartered in Taichung City's Precision Machinery Innovation Technology Park. They have also purchased nearby lands and plan to centralize their production line.

== Locations ==
With the corporate headquarter based in Taichung, Taiwan, Largan currently operates four factories in Taiwan and two in China.

== Legal dispute ==
In 2013, Largan Precision sued Ability Opto-Electronic Technology Co (Chinese: 先進光電) for stealing its trade secret. Claimed that four engineers, originally in Largan Precision, started filing patents that infringed on its intellectual property. After more than eight years of litigation, on January 28, 2021, the Intellectual Property Court upheld its first instance judgment, ordering Ability to pay NT$1.52 billion(US$53.72 million) in compensation. This set a record of the highest amount of compensation in the history of Taiwan's intellectual property lawsuits. Right after the two companies reached an out-of-court settlement, Largan bought 20 million shares of Ability Optoelectronics Technology Co, giving Largan Precision 15.2 percent of its stock rights.

Over the years, Largan had also sued Newmax Technology Co (Chinese: 新鉅科), Samsung Electronics Co, and HP Inc for infringing on four of the company's patents and used it in the production of notebook camera lenses. It is the first time Largan litigated to protect its intellectual property rights for lenses used in notebooks.

== See also ==
- Samsung Electro-Mechanics
