= Scott Lin =

Taiwanese billionaire

- Born: 1933 (age 91–92)
- Children: 2

Scott Lin (Chinese: 林耀英; born 1933) is a Taiwanese billionaire and co-founder of Largan Precision.

== Life and career ==
Scott Lin was born in 1933. Largan Optronic began in 1969, and was succeeded by Largan Precision in 1987 after a NT$10 million investment. As chairman and chief executive of Largan Precision, Lin became known for his taciturn demeanor. Lin was succeeded as chairman of Largan by company cofounder Tony Chen in 2010. Lin's youngest son Adam later assumed the company chairmanship. Lin made his first appearance on Forbes' list of Taiwanese billionaires in 2014 and was ranked thirty-third in the nation with a net worth of US$1.2 billion. Lin was listed on The World's Billionaires for the first time in 2015; his fortune was valued at US$1.5 billion. In early 2017, Lin's net worth was US$3.2 billion, ranking seventy-sixth on a Forbes list of businesspeople in technology, and ninth on Taiwan's list. When the 2017 Forbes Taiwan Rich List was released in June, Lin was valued at US$2.7 billion and ranked thirteenth.

Lin is married and has two sons, Lin En-chou and Adam Lin.
