= Samsung Electro-Mechanics =

South Korean company

Samsung Electro-Mechanics 삼성전기
- Type: Public
- Traded as: KRX: 009150; KRX: 009155
- Industry: Telecommunication; Semiconductor; Electronic Component
- Genre: Electronics
- Founded: 1973; 53 years ago
- Headquarters: Suwon, Gyeonggi Province, South Korea
- Area served: Worldwide
- Key people: Chang, Duckhyun (CEO)
- Products: IC substrates, semiconductor substrates, Printed circuit board (PCB), Camera module, Chip Capacitor, Inductor, Resistor
- Revenue: US$ 6,944 million (2019)
- Operating income: US$ 633 million (2019)
- Net income: US$ 535 million (2019)
- Total assets: US$ 7,492 million (2019)
- Owner: Samsung Electronics (23.69%)
- Number of employees: 34,212 (2019)
- Parent: Samsung Group
- Website: www.samsungsem.com

Samsung Electro-Mechanics (SEM, 삼성전기) is a multinational electronic component company headquartered in Suwon, Gyeonggi Province, South Korea. It is a subsidiary of the Samsung Group. The company produces chip parts such as Multi-Layer Ceramic Capacitors (MLCC), Inductors, Resistors, IC Substrate, semiconductor substrates, camera modules, network modules and printed circuit boards.

Established in 1973 as Samsung Sanyo Parts, the name was changed to Samsung Electric Parts the following year. The name was again changed to Samsung Electronics Parts in 1977, and then to Samsung Electro-Mechanics in 1987. The company is headquartered in Suwon, with additional manufacturing facilities in Sejong and Busan, and overseas in Calamba, Laguna, Philippines and Thailand. It also once had such facility in Tianjin, China.

== Products ==
Samsung Electro-Mechanics specializes in the manufacture of passive components and specialized electronic modules. The company's primary output includes Multi-Layer Ceramic Capacitors (MLCC), chip resistors, and inductors. Additionally, the firm develops semiconductor substrates, such as organic IC substrates and rigid-flex printed circuit boards (PCBs), alongside hardware modules for telecommunications, including camera and network modules.

== Governance ==
As of January 2026, Samsung Electro-Mechanics’ Board of Directors is composed of 3 inside directors and 4 independent directors, with 6 board committees. These committees are the Compensation Committee, Management Committee, Audit Committee, Independent Directors Candidate Recommendation Committee, and the Internal Transaction Committee, and the ESG Committee. An independent director serves as chairman of the board.

== Environmental management ==
=== Greenhouse gases ===
The company received recognition from the Carbon Disclosure Project (CDP) Korea Committee between 2014 and 2016.

=== Energy ===
In the 34th Energy-Saving Promotion conference awarding a prize to person who contributed to the improvement of energy efficiency and overcoming the power supply crisis, Chi-joon Choi, CEO of Samsung Electro-Mechanics was awarded the Silver Tower Industry medal.

== Outreach ==
The company engages in various social outreach programs, including medical support and music initiatives for people with disabilities.
