= Camera module =

Image sensor

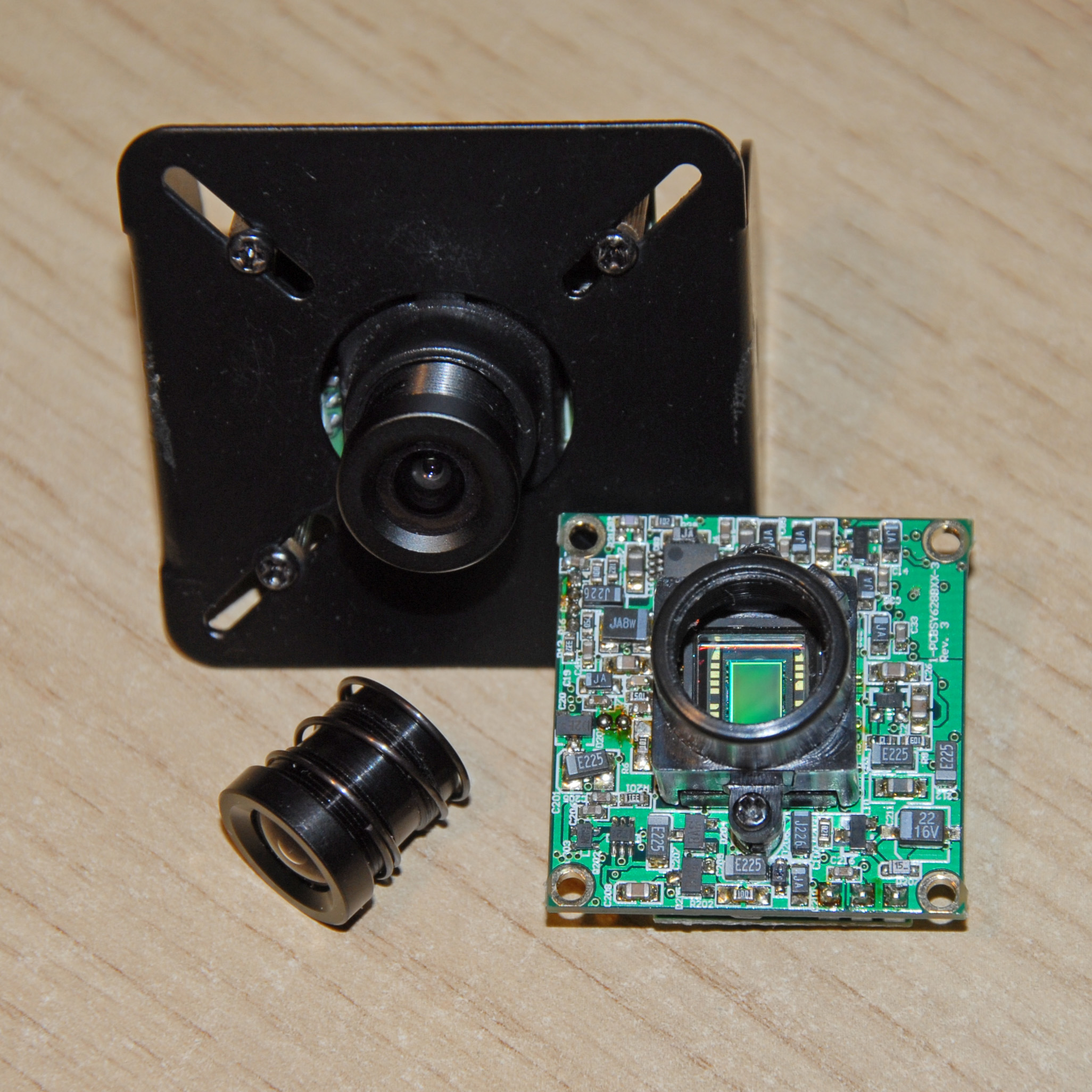
Camera PCB with a 1/3" Sony CCD

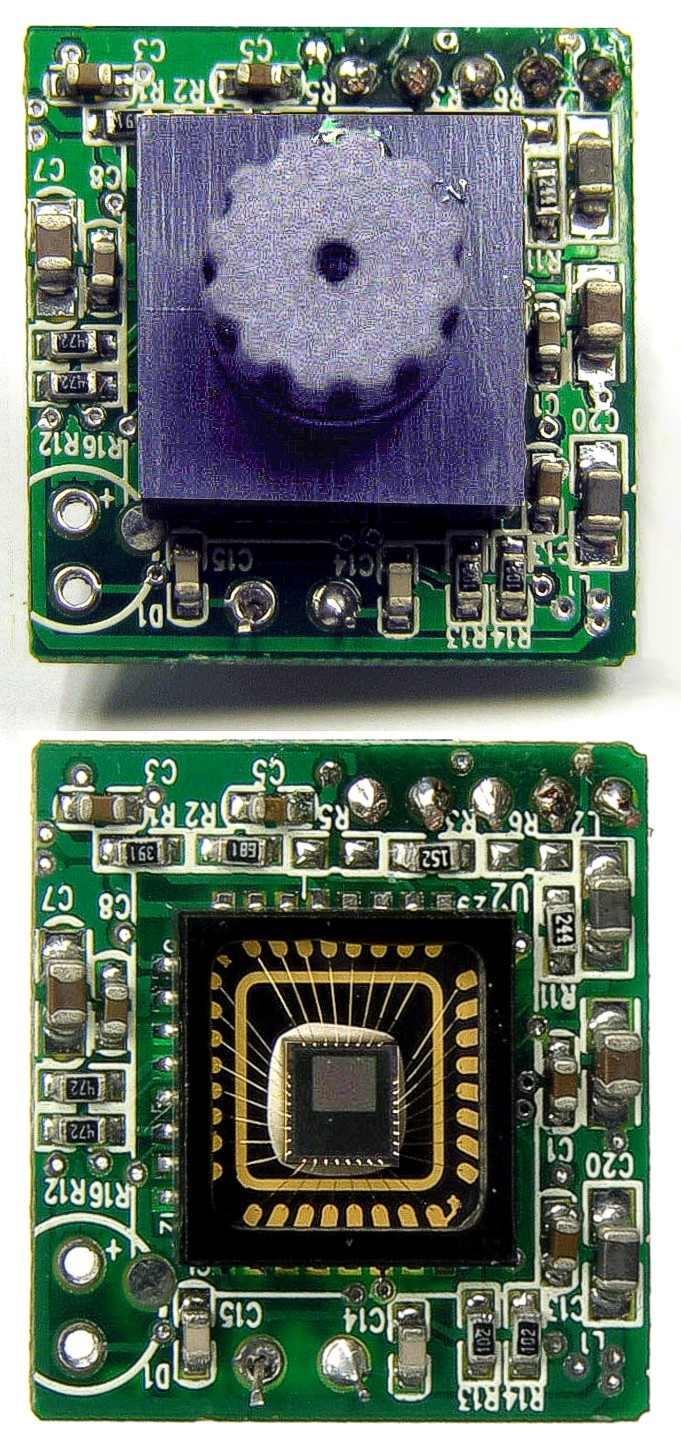
Camera modules may include a lens (shown at top), an image sensor (shown at bottom), and supporting circuitry.

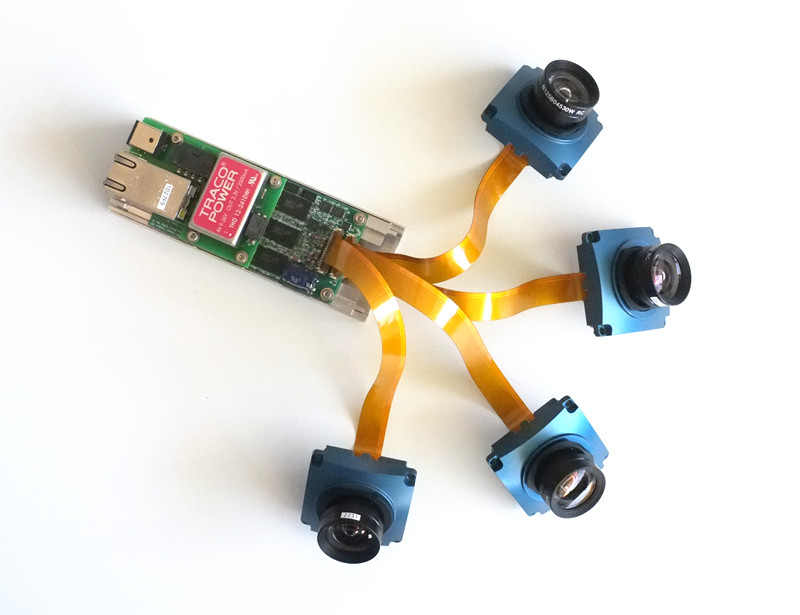
NC393 multisensor camera kit, for developers

A camera module is an image sensor integrated with a camera lens, control electronics and a data communication interface like CSI, Ethernet, Wi-Fi or plain raw low-voltage differential signaling. It is a core component of modern photography/videography devices such as digital cameras, camera phones, webcams, action cameras, surveillance cameras and trail camera.

== See also ==
- IP camera
- Mobile Industry Processor Interface (MIPI)
- Elphel - multi-sensor camera based on FPGA and Ethernet interface. Previous camera models were used with Google Books and street view
