= Camera interface =

The Camera Interface block or CAMIF is the hardware block that interfaces with different image sensor interfaces and provides a standard output that can be used for subsequent image processing.

A typical Camera Interface would support at least a parallel interface although these days many camera interfaces are beginning to support the Mobile Industry Processor Interface (MIPI) Camera Serial Interface (CSI) interface.

== Electrical connections ==
The camera interface's parallel interface consists of the following lines:

8 to 12 bits parallel data line These are parallel data lines that carry pixel data. The data transmitted on these lines change with every Pixel Clock (PCLK).

Horizontal Sync (HSYNC) This is a special signal that goes from the camera sensor or ISP to the camera interface. An HSYNC indicates that one line of the frame is transmitted.

Vertical Sync (VSYNC) This signal is transmitted after the entire frame is transferred. This signal is often a way to indicate that one entire frame is transmitted.

Pixel Clock (PCLK) This is the pixel clock and it would change on every pixel.

NOTE: The above lines are all treated as input lines to the Camera Interface hardware.

== See also ==
- Digital camera
- Digital photography
- Demosaicing
- Digital image processing
- Camera Serial Interface (CSI)
