= Bus Pirate =

Microcontroller programmer and debugger

Bus Pirate 5
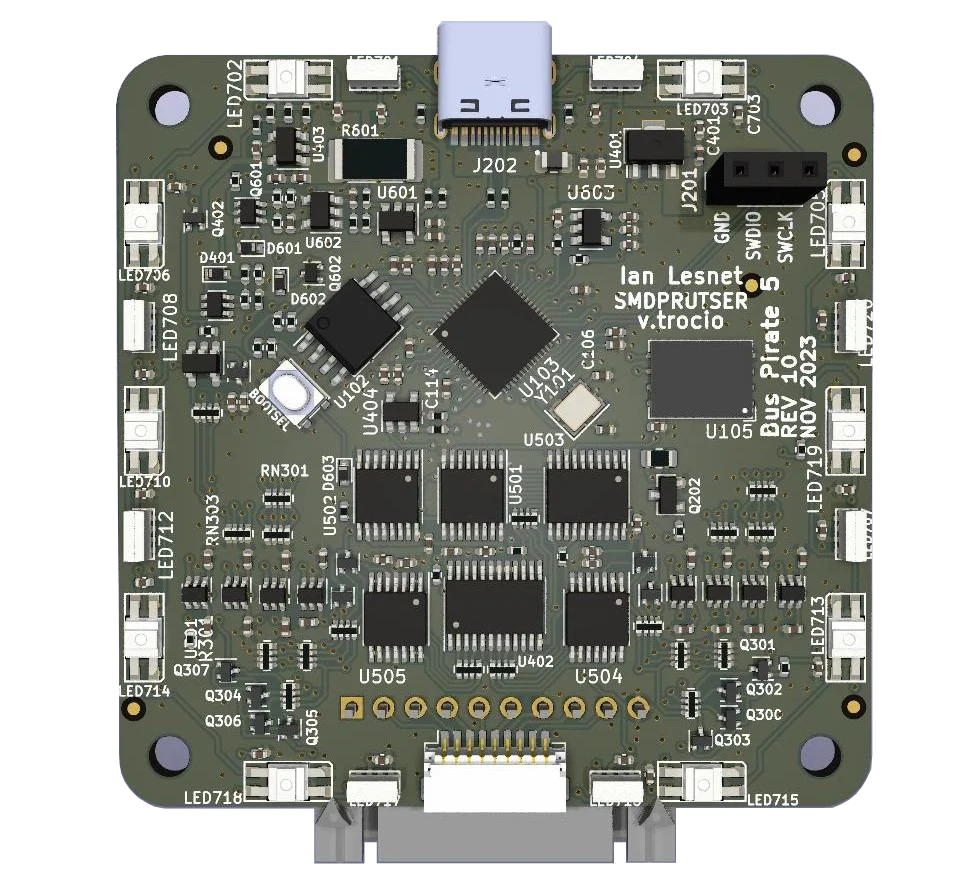
- Bus Pirate 5 PCB
- Developer: Dangerous Prototypes
- Type: Debugger
- Predecessor: Bus Pirate v4.0
- Successor: Bus Pirate 6
- Website: buspirate.com

The Bus Pirate is a universal bus interface device designed for programming, debugging, and analyzing microcontrollers and other ICs. It was developed as an open-source hardware and software project.

== Overview ==
The Bus Pirate was designed for debugging, prototyping, and analysing "new or unknown chips". Using a Bus Pirate, a developer can use a serial terminal to interface with a device, via such hardware protocols as SPI, I^{2}C and 1-Wire.

The Bus Pirate is capable of programming low-end microcontrollers, such as Atmel AVRs and Microchip PICs. Programming using more advanced protocols such as JTAG and SWD is possible but limited due to hardware speed. Support for JTAG version 5 is in progress.

The Bus Pirate 5 was designed by Ian Lesnet of Dangerous Prototypes and Sjaak of SMD Prutser.

== Feature list ==
The Bus Pirate v3.6 can communicate via the following serial protocols, with line levels of 0–5.5 volts: 1-Wire, I²C, SPI, JTAG, asynchronous serial, and MIDI.

It can receive input from a keyboard, and can output to a Hitachi HD44780 LCD controller.

Other features:

- UART
- 2- and 3-wire libraries with bitwise pin control
- 0 – 6 volt measurement probe
- 1 Hz – 40 MHz frequency measurement
- 1 kHz – 4 MHz pulse-width modulator, frequency generator
- On-board multi-voltage pull-up resistors
- On-board 3.3 volt and 5 volt power supplies with software reset
- Macros for common operations
- Bus traffic sniffers (SPI, I²C)
- A bootloader for easy firmware updates
- Transparent USB -> serial mode
- 10 Hz – 1 MHz SUMP compatible low-speed logic analyzer
- AVR STK500 v2 programmer clone, supported in AVRDude programmer software

== Generational differences ==
	Bus Pirate v3.6	Bus Pirate v4.0	Bus Pirate 5	Bus Pirate 5XL	Bus Pirate 6
Development status	Mature	Discontinued	Active	Active	Active
Dimensions (mm)	60×37	60×37	60x60	60x60	60x60
Microcontroller	PIC24FJ64GA002	PIC24FJ256GB106	RP2040	RP2350A	RP2350B
Clock Frequency (MHz)	32	Unknown	125	133	133
Program Flash (kB)	64	256	16,384	16,384	16,384
Storage Flash (MB)	—	—	128	128	128
SRAM (kB)	8	16	264	520	520
I/O pins	5	7	8	8	8
Main Header	5×2 pin header	6×2 pin header	10×1 pin header	10×1 pin header	10×1 pin header
Auxiliary Header	—	—	9×1 pin header	9×1 pin header	9×1 pin header
USB Interface	FTDI FT232RL	PIC24-integrated	RP2040-integrated	RP2350-integrated	RP2350-integrated
USB Connector	USB Mini-B	USB Mini-B	USB-C	USB-C	USB-C
Logic Analyser	Low-speed	Unknown	Inputs Only	Inputs Only	Yes
JTAG	Limited	Limited	In Progress	No	No

The size of the circuit board was changed to 60 mm x 37 mm in the Bus Pirate v3.6 and up so it would match the mounting holes for the "Sick of Beige" DP6037 case.

The Bus Pirate v3.6 is based on an PIC24 MCU (SSOP), and communicates with a host computer with either a USB interface with a FT232RL (SSOP) or an on-chip USB module.

The Bus Pirate 5 was in development for many years, initially developed with an ARM based STM32 microcontroller. An FPGA was then added to give flexibility over pin assignments and a fast logic analyser. Due to supply chain issues with the STM32s, the release was delayed for an additional 2 years until the release of the RP2040 when the board was redesigned around it, forming the modern day design.

The Bus Pirate 5, 5XL and 6 have a 320x240 IPS display that allows seeing the voltage of IO pins, status and current draw at a glance.

== See also ==
- Flipper Zero
- Flashrom
