= Thumby =

Thumby may refer to:

- Thumby (game console), a miniature video game console
- Thumby, Schleswig-Holstein, a municipality in Schleswig-Holstein, Germany
