= LVF =

LVF may refer to:

- Loyalist Volunteer Force, a paramilitary group in Northern Ireland
- Légion des volontaires français contre le bolchévisme, a French collaborationist military unit in the German Army
- Left ventricular failure, a heart condition
- Land-vertebrate faunachron, a biochronology system primarily used for Triassic tetrapods
- Lineated valley fill, a geologic feature observed on Mars
- Luxury vinyl flooring, a flooring material

== See also ==
- Linux Vendor Firmware Service (LVFS), an online repository for obtaining updates
