= RP2040 =

ARM-architecture microcontroller by the Raspberry Pi Foundation

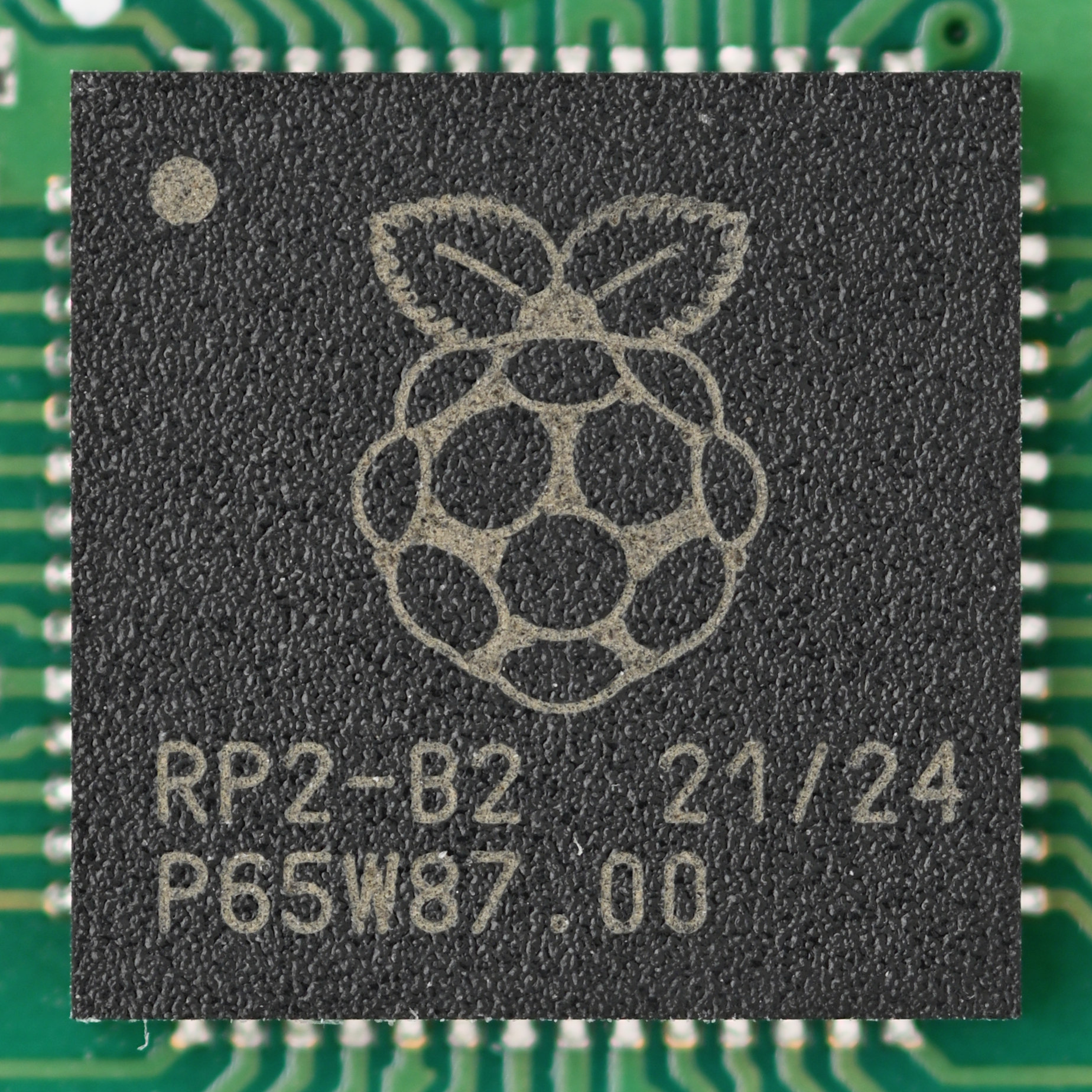
RP2040 microcontroller

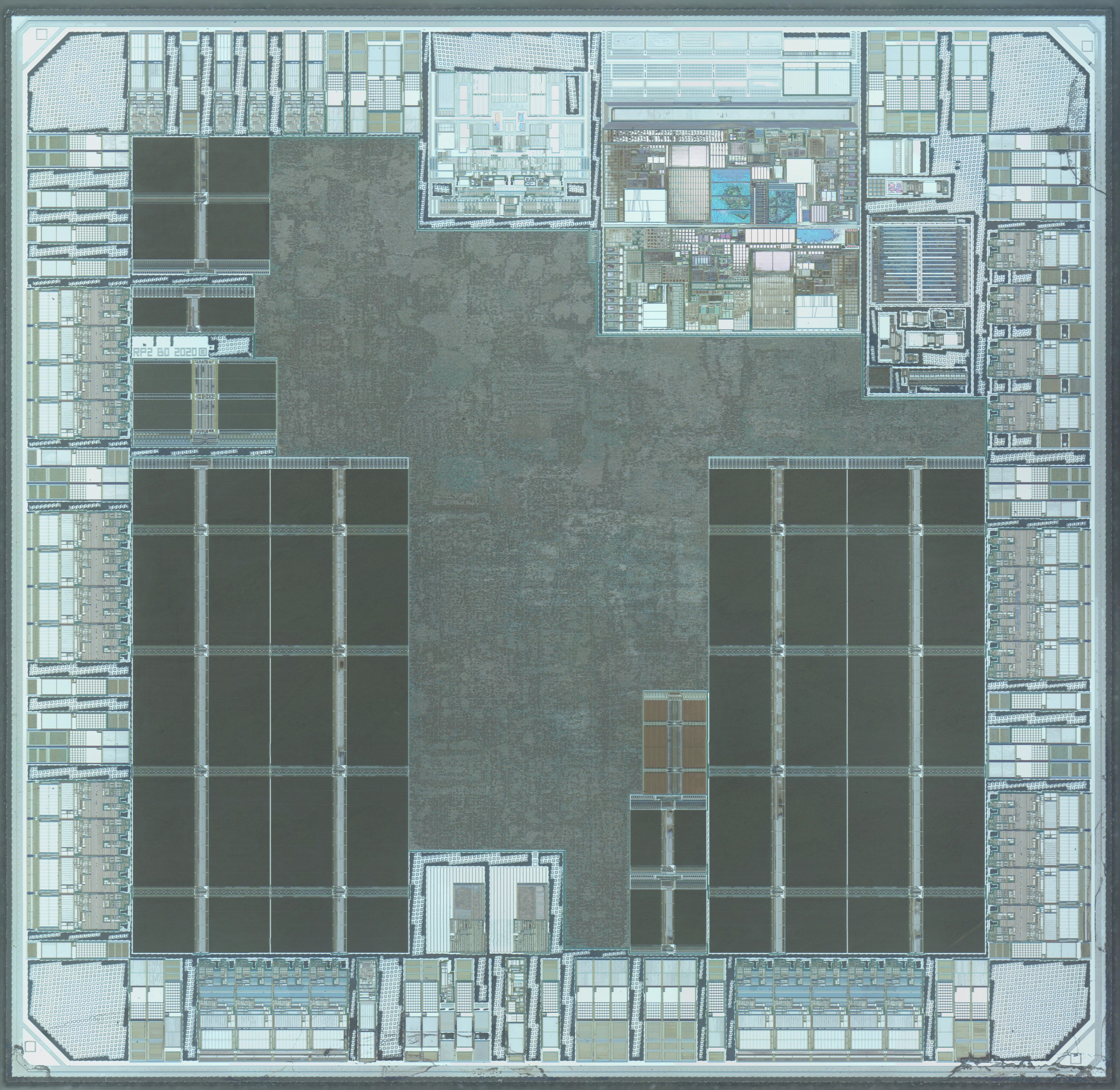
RP2040 die shot

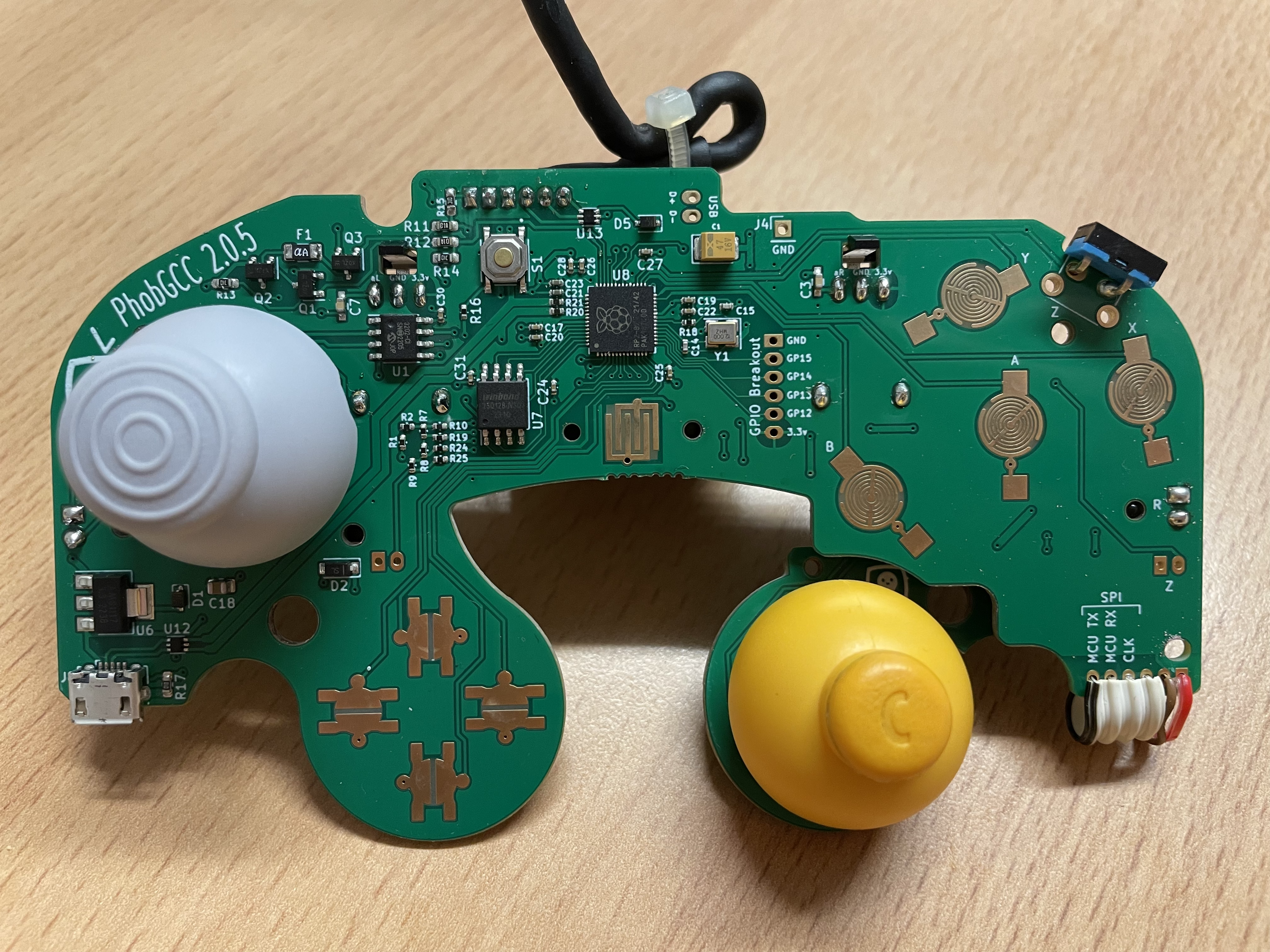
A PhobGCC, an open-source motherboard replacement for the GameCube controller designed for competitive Super Smash Bros. Melee, powered by the RP2040

RP2040 is a 32-bit dual-core ARM Cortex-M0+ microcontroller designed by Raspberry Pi Ltd. In January 2021, it was released as part of the Raspberry Pi Pico board. Its successor is the RP2350 series.

== Overview ==
Announced on 21 January 2021, the RP2040 is the first microcontroller designed by Raspberry Pi Ltd. The microcontroller is low cost, with the Raspberry Pi Pico being introduced at US$4 and the RP2040 itself costing US$1. The microcontroller can be programmed in assembly, C, C++, Forth, Swift, Free Pascal, Rust, Go, MicroPython, CircuitPython, PicoRuby, Ada, TypeScript and Zig. It is powerful enough to run TensorFlow Lite.

At announcement time, four other manufacturers (Adafruit, Pimoroni, Arduino, SparkFun) were at advanced stages of their product design, awaiting the widespread availability of chips to be put into production.

Hackaday notes the benefits of the RP2040 as being from Raspberry Pi, having a good feature set, and being released in low-cost packages.

Multiple stepping levels of the chip have been produced.

== Features ==
The RP2040 chip is a 7-by-7-millimetre (0.28 in × 0.28 in) QFN-56EP surface-mount device (SMD) package manufactured by TSMC using its 40 nm process.

- Key features:
  - Dual ARM Cortex-M0+ cores (ARMv6-M instruction set), Originally run at 133 MHz, but later certified at 200 MHz
    - Each core has an integer divider peripheral and two interpolators
  - 264 KB SRAM in six independent banks (four 64 KB, two 4 KB)
  - No internal flash or EEPROM memory (after reset, the boot-loader loads firmware from either external flash memory or USB into internal SRAM)
  - QSPI bus controller supports up to 16 MB of external flash memory
  - DMA controller, 12 channel, 2 IRQ
  - AHB crossbar, fully-connected
  - On-chip programmable low-dropout regulator (LDO) to generate core voltage
  - Two on-chip PLLs to generate USB and core clocks
  - 30 GPIO pins, of which four can optionally be used as analog inputs
- Peripherals:
  - One USB 1.1 (LS & FS) controller and PHY, host and device support, 1.5 Mbit/s (Low Speed) and 12 Mbit/s (Full Speed)
  - Two UART controllers
  - Two SPI controllers
  - One QSPI (quad SPI) controller (SSI), supports 1 / 2 / 4-bit SPI transfers, 1 chip select
  - Two I²C controllers
  - Eight PIO (programmable input–output) state machines
  - 16 PWM channels
  - 4-channel 12-bit 500-ksps SAR ADC, extra channel is connected to internal temperature sensor

For comparison with the RP2350, see RP2350 § Family comparison.

== Boards ==
A number of manufacturers have announced their own boards using the RP2040. A selection of the growing number is here:

Board name	Manufacturer	Size (mm)	Header pins	Debug connection	Number of pads	USB connector	Other connectors	Flash size	GPIO pins	ADC pins	Buttons	Other features	Image
Pico	Raspberry Pi Ltd	51×21	40+3	via headers	6	micro-USB		2 MB	26	3	BOOTSEL		
Pico W	Raspberry Pi Ltd	51×21	40+3	via headers	6	micro-USB		2 MB	26	3	BOOTSEL	Wi-Fi, Bluetooth	
XIAO RP2040	Seeed Studio	20×17.5×3.5	14	Reset Button/ Boot Button		USB Type-C interface		2 MB			BOOTSEL + RESET		
Nano RP2040 Connect	Arduino	45×18	30	via pads	5+4+2	micro-USB		16 MB			1	Wi-Fi, Bluetooth, 9-axis IMU, microphone	
Tiny 2040	Pimoroni	22.9×18.2×6	8+3	via headers		USB-C		8 MB	12	4	BOOTSEL + RESET		
Keybow 2040	Pimoroni	76x76x30	0 (USB only)			USB-C		2 MB			16 keys		
PicoSystem	Pimoroni	96.6×42.7×15.5	0 (self contained)			USB-C		16 MB			4 + joypad	Color 240×240 LCD, onboard battery	
Feather RP2040	Adafruit	51×23×7	28	via pins		USB-C	STEMMA QT, lipo battery	8 MB	21	4	BOOTSEL + RESET	Battery charger	
ItsyBitsy RP2040	Adafruit	36×18×4	33	via headers		micro-USB		4 MB	23	4	BOOTSEL + RESET		
Metro RP2040	Adafruit	71x53×13	32	SWD + 3 pin JST SH compatible		USB Type-C	DC jack for 6-12VDC / STEMMA QT / SWD / pico probe	16 MB	24	4	BOOTSEL + RESET	NeoPixel LED, Micro SD	
QT Py RP2040	Adafruit	22×18×6	14	Reset Button/ Boot Button		USB-C	STEMMA QT	8 MB	13	4	BOOTSEL + RESET	3.3vdc regulator, NeoPixel LED	
Pro Micro – RP2040	Sparkfun	36×18	24		4+2	USB-C	QWIIC	16 MB	20	4	BOOTSEL + RESET		
Thing Plus RP2040	Sparkfun	59×23	28	JTAG pins		USB-C	QWIIC, lipo battery	16 MB	18	4	BOOTSEL + RESET	Battery charger	
MicroMod RP2040	Sparkfun	22×22	0			edge connector	edge connector	16 MB	29	3	none		
Müsli USB Pmod	Lone Dynamics	45×20.32	12	SWD		USB Type-A female	12-pin male PMOD, SWD	256 KB	8	0	BOOTSEL	USB host, 5V boost converter	
Werkzeug USB Multi-Tool	Lone Dynamics	50×50	32			USB-C	12-pin female PMOD, USB Type-A female	1 MB	24	4	BOOTSEL	USB device/host, PMOD	
RP2040	WeAct Studio	53x21.52	40+4	via headers		USB-C		2 MB, 4 MB, 8 MB, 16 MB	26	4	BOOTSEL + RESET		
RP2040-Zero	Waveshare Electronics	23×18	23			USB-C	10-pad connector	2 MB	29	4	BOOTSEL + RESET	RGB LED (WS2812)	
Pico2040	zeankun.dev	51x18	40+3 (2mm and 2.54mm variants are available)	SWD	4	micro-USB		16 MB, 32 MB, 64 MB, 128 MB	28	4	BOOTSEL + RESET		
Bus Pirate 5	Where Labs, LLC	60x37	10+9	SWD		USB-C		16MB					
W5100S-EVB-Pico	WIZnet Co., Ltd.	75x21	40+3	via headers		Micro-USB	RJ45	2 MB	26	3	BOOTSEL + RESET	Ethernet	
W5500-EVB-Pico	WIZnet Co., Ltd.	75x21	40+3	via headers		Micro-USB	RJ45	2 MB	26	3	BOOTSEL + RESET	Ethernet	
W6100-EVB-Pico	WIZnet Co., Ltd.	75x21	40+3	via headers		Micro-USB	RJ45	2 MB	26	3	BOOTSEL + RESET	Ethernet	
WizFi360-EVB-Pico	WIZnet Co., Ltd.	75×21	40+3	via headers		Micro-USB		2 MB	26	3	BOOTSEL + RESET	Wi-Fi	
0xCB-Helios	0xCB	36×18	40+3	via headers		USB-C		16 MB	29		BOOTSEL + RESET	default off red power LED, blue user LED, level shifter to drive 5V components. ESD protection chip onboard	
Picopad	Pájeníčko s.r.o.	129x53	12	via headers		micro-USB	microSD, external connector	2 MB	6		BOOTSEL + RESET	on-off, Wi-Fi, micro SD card, external connector, IPS screen, speaker, battery	
MUREX ANYESC	MUREX Robotics	78×35	3	via headers		USB-C	edge connector	8 MB	3	0	BOOTSEL + RESET	commercial ESC connector, 3 user LEDs	
RP2040-PICO30	OLIMEX Ltd	51×21	40+3	via headers		USB-C	Optional UEXT (pUEXT)	2 MB	30	4	BOOTSEL + RESET	3.3V 2A (3A peak) DCDC, All 30 GPIOs available to the user, Optional status LED	
RP2040-PICO30-16	OLIMEX Ltd	51×21	40+3	via headers		USB-C	Optional UEXT (pUEXT)	16 MB	30	4	BOOTSEL + RESET	3.3V 2A (3A peak) DCDC, All 30 GPIOs available to the user, Optional status LED	
PicoUSB	VoltMake	45×12x4	0 (USB only)			Dual sided USB-A		2 MB			BOOTSEL + MODE	status LED	PicoUSB

== See also ==
- Arduino – a popular microcontroller board family
- ESP32 – a series of low-cost, low-power system on a chip microcontrollers with integrated Wi-Fi and dual-mode Bluetooth.
- STM32 – a family of 32-bit microcontroller integrated circuits
- Raspberry Pi – Raspberry Pi's series of small single board computers
- Thumby (console) – a thumb-sized micro-console powered by the RP2040
