= Webduino =

BPI:Bit
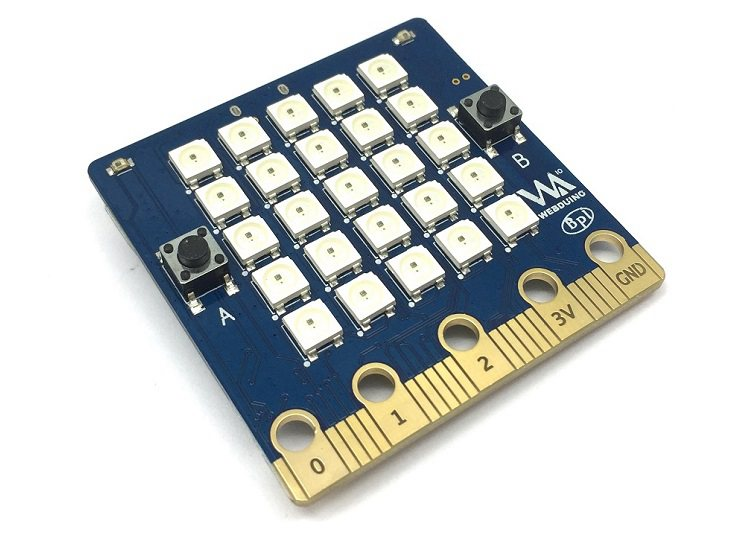
- Developer: Banana Pi &webduino
- Type: Single-board microcontroller
- Released: 2018
- CPU: ESP32 with Xtensa 32bit LX6 single/dual-core processor
- Connectivity: Wi-Fi, Bluetooth LE, MicroUSB, edge connector
- Website: webduino.com.cn

The BPI Bit (also referred to as BPI:bit, stylised as webduino:bit) is an ESP32 with Xtensa 32bit LX6 single/dual-core processor based embedded system

The board is 5 cm × 5 cm and has an ESP32 module with Xtensa 32bit LX6 single/dual-core processor, with a capacity of up to 600DMIPS, with a built-in 448KB ROM and 520 KB SRAM accelerometer and magnetometer sensors, 2.4G WiFi, Bluetooth and USB connectivity, a display consisting of 25 light-emitting diodes, two programmable buttons, and can be powered by either USB or an external battery pack. The device inputs and outputs are through five ring connectors that are part of the 23-pin edge connector.

BPI:bit provides a wide range of onboard resources, supports photosensitive sensor, digital triaxial sensor, digital compass, temperature sensor interface. Webduino:bit have 25 intelligent control LED light source that the control circuit and RGB chip are integrated in a package of 5050 components. Cascading port transmission signal by single line. Each pixel of the three primary color can achieve 256 brightness display, completed 16777216 color full color display, and scan frequency not less than 400 Hz/s.

BPI:bit use MPU9250 on board, MPU-9250 is a multi-chip module (MCM) consisting of two dies integrated into a single QFN package. One die houses the 3-Axis gyroscope and the 3-Axis accelerometer. The other die houses the AK8963 3-Axis magnetometer from Asahi Kasei Microdevices Corporation. Hence, the MPU-9250 is a 9-axis MotionTracking device that combines a 3-axis gyroscope, 3-axis accelerometer, 3-axis magnetometer and a Digital Motion Processor™ (DMP) all in a small 3x3x1mm package available as a pin-compatible upgrade from the MPU-6515. With its dedicated I2C sensor bus, the MPU-9250directly provides complete 9-axis MotionFusion™ output. The MPU-9250 MotionTracking device, with its 9-axis integration, on-chip MotionFusion™, and runtime calibration firmware, enables manufacturers to eliminate the costly and complex selection, qualification, and system level integration of discrete devices, guaranteeing optimal motion performance for consumers. MPU-9250 is also designed to interface with multiple non-inertial digital sensors, such as pressure sensors, on its auxiliary I²C port.

BPI:bit interface：

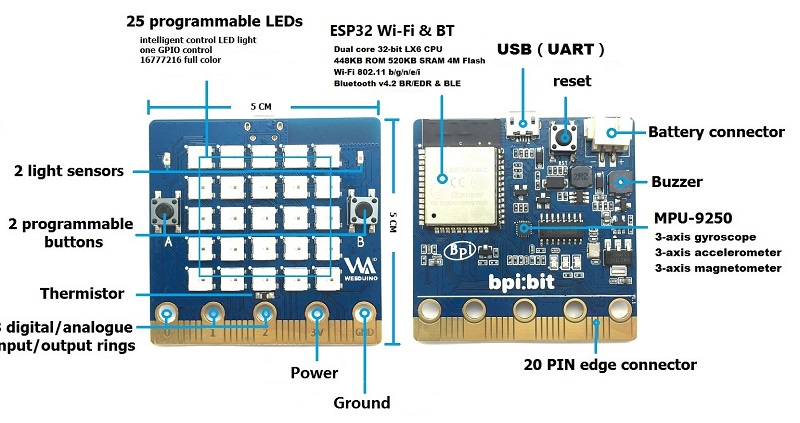

BPI:bit for arduino Source code on GitHub: https://github.com/BPI-STEAM

BPI:bit for webduino source code on GitHub: https://github.com/webduinoio

BPI:bit wiki page : http://wiki.banana-pi.org/BPI-Bit

== BPI:UNO32 for Webduino & Arduino ==
BPI:UNO32
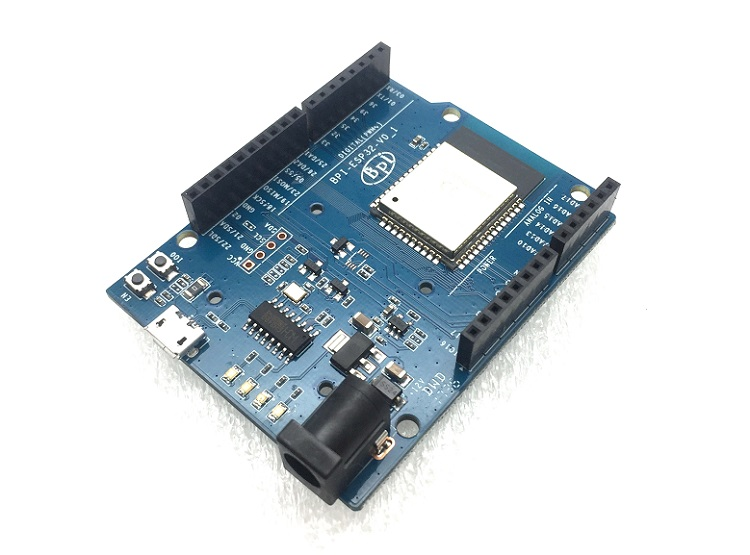
- Developer: Banana Pi &webduino
- Type: Single-board microcontroller
- Released: 2018
- CPU: ESP32 with Xtensa 32bit LX6 single/dual-core processor
- Connectivity: Wi-Fi, Bluetooth LE, MicroUSB
- Website: webduino.com.cn

The BPI:UNO32 (also referred to as BPI UNO32, stylised as BPI-UNO32), BPI-UNO32 uses the ESP-WROOM-32 of Espressif company as MCU. ESP32 is a single-chip solution integrating 2.4 GHz Wi-Fi and Bluetooth dual mode. The 40 nanometer technology of TSMC has the best power consumption, RF performance, stability, versatility and reliability. It can deal with various application scenarios.

Two separate controlled CPU cores, the main frequency can be up to 240 MHz, 448KB ROM, 520KB SRAM.

BPI-UNO32 The appearance size is fully matched with Arduino UNO R3

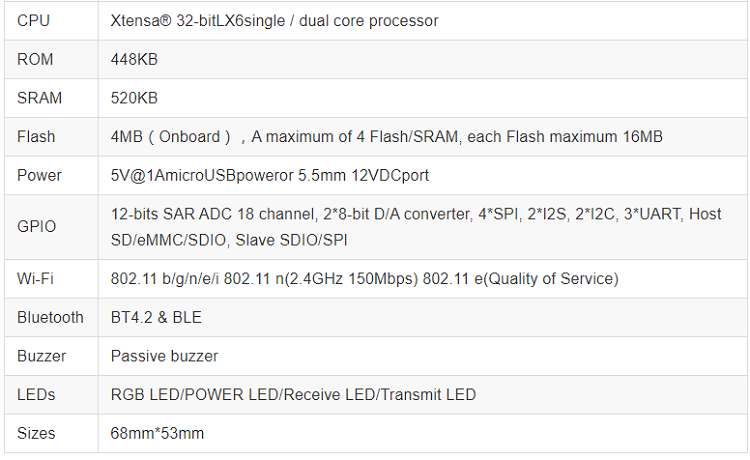

BPI:UNO32 for arduino Source code on GitHub: https://github.com/BPI-STEAM

BPI-UNO32 BPI wik page : http://wiki.banana-pi.org/BPI-UNO32

== BPI:Smart for Webduino & Arduino ==
BPI:Smart
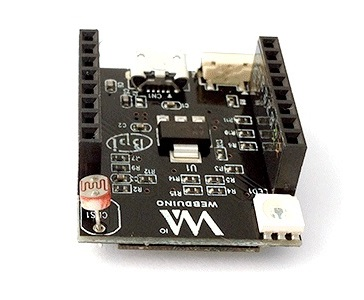
- Developer: Banana Pi &webduino
- Type: Single-board microcontroller
- Released: 2016
- CPU: ESP8266
- Connectivity: Wi-Fi, Bluetooth LE, MicroUSB
- Website: webduino.com.cn

The BPI:Smart (also referred to as BPI-Smart, stylised as Webduino Smart), it use ESP8266 design, Webduino official support it. also can support Arduino.

BPI:Smart Board dimensions: 3 cm in length, 2.5 cm in width, 1.3 cm in height, and a weight of 85 grams. Digital pins: 0, 2, 4, 5, 14, and 16. PWM pins: 12, 13, 15. Analog Pin: AD (A0). Other pins: TX, RX, 3.3V, VCC, RST, and GRD.

BPI:Smart has a photocell sensor, an RGB LED, and a micro switch button on board. The photocell is connected to the AD pin, and the RGB (Red, Geen, Blue) LED is connected to pins 15, 12, and 13 respectively (The LED is a common cathode, whereas most of the examples on this site use common anode RGB LED.) And the micro switch button is connected to pin 4. Please take note when you use these pins.

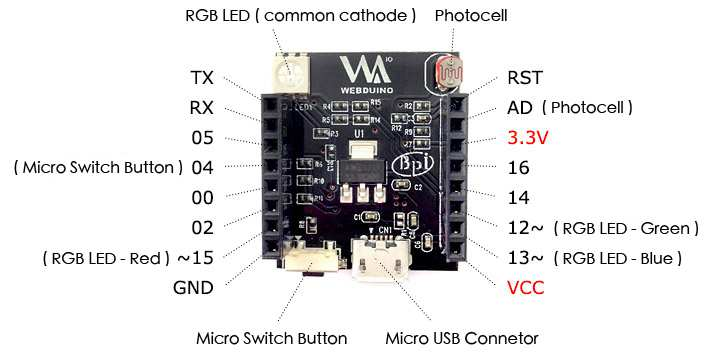

BPI-smart BPI wiki page ： http://wiki.banana-pi.org/BPI-Smart
