= ESP32 =

Low-cost, low-power SoC microcontrollers with Bluetooth and Wi-Fi

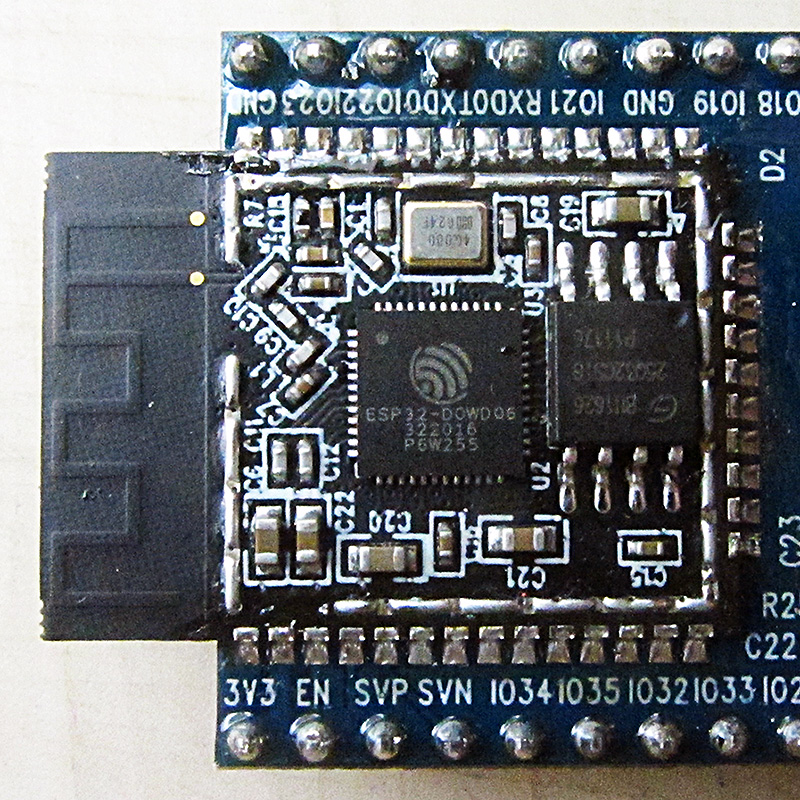
- ESP-WROOM-32 module with ESP32-D0WDQ6 chip
- Manufacturer: Espressif Systems
- Type: Microcontroller
- Released: September 6, 2016
- CPU: Tensilica Xtensa LX6; Tensilica Xtensa LX7; RISC-V
- Memory: 520 KiB SRAM
- Power: 3.3 V DC
- Predecessor: ESP8266

ESP32 is a family of low-cost, energy-efficient microcontrollers that support both Wi-Fi and Bluetooth. These chips feature several processing options, including the Tensilica Xtensa LX6 microprocessor available in dual-core and single-core variants, the Xtensa LX7 dual-core processor, or a RISC-V microprocessor. The ESP32 incorporates components for wireless data communication such as built-in antenna switches, an RF balun, power amplifiers, low-noise receivers, filters, and power-management modules.

Typically, the ESP32 is embedded on device-specific printed circuit boards (PCBs) or offered as part of development kits that include a variety of GPIO pins and connectors, with configurations varying by model and manufacturer. The ESP32 was designed by Espressif Systems and is manufactured by TSMC using their 40 nm process. It is a successor to the ESP8266 microcontroller.

== Features ==
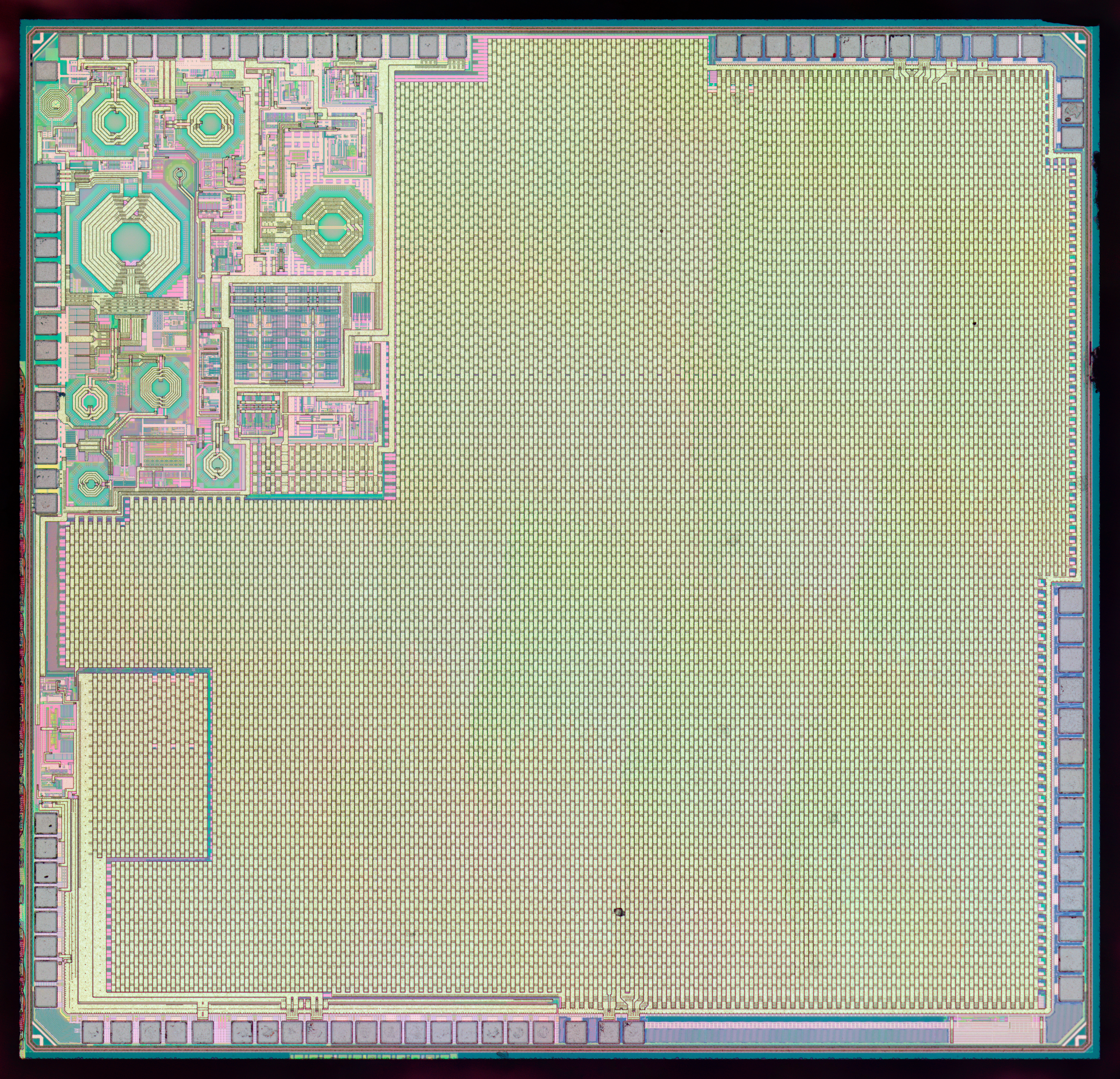
ESP32 die shot. Most of the chip area is covered by a power distribution network on the top metal layers.

Since the release of the original ESP32, a number of variants have been introduced and announced. They form the ESP32 family of microcontrollers. These chips have different CPUs and capabilities, but all share the same SDK and are largely code-compatible. Additionally, the original ESP32 was revised (see ESP32 ECO V3, esp 32 cam for example).

ESP32 family
Feature	ESP32	ESP32-S2	ESP32-S3		ESP32-C2	ESP32-C3	ESP32-C5	ESP32-C6	ESP32-C61	ESP32-H2	ESP32-P4	ESP32-S31
CPU	Xtensa LX6	Xtensa LX7	Xtensa LX7		RV32IMAC	RV32IMC	RV32IMAC	RV32IMAC	RV32IMAC	RV32IMAC	RV32IMAFC	RV32IMAFC
CPU cores	Single, Dual	Single	Dual		Single						Dual	
CPU frequency	240 MHz				120 MHz	160 MHz	240 MHz	160 MHz		96 MHz	400 MHz	320 MHz
Coprocessor	FSM		FSM	RV32IMC	No		RV32IMC		No		RV32IMC	RISC-V
Coprocessor speed	20 MHz		20 MHz	17.5 MHz	No		40 MHz	20 MHz	No		20 MHz	?
FPU	Single precision	No	Single precision		No						Single precision	
SRAM	520 KiB	320 KiB	512 KiB		272 KiB	400 KiB	384 KiB	512 KiB	320 KiB	256 KiB	768 KiB	512 KiB
ROM	448 KiB	128 KiB	384 KiB		128 KiB	384 KiB			256 KiB	128 KiB	512 KiB	320 KiB
RTC SRAM	8 KiB	16 KiB			8 KiB		16 KiB			8 KiB	32 KiB	
PSRAM	4 MiB		8 MiB		No		8 MiB	No	8 MiB	No	16 MiB	64 MiB
SPI	Quad		Octal		Quad						Octal	
UART	3	2	3		2				3	2	5	4
Wi-FI	802.11 b/g/n						802.11 b/g/n/ac/ax	802.11 b/g/n/ax		No		802.11 b/g/n/ax
Ethernet MAC + RMII	Yes	SPI only									Yes	Yes (Gigabit)
Bluetooth	4.2 + BR/EDR, LE	No	5 + LE					5.3 + LE	6 + LE	5.3 + LE	No	5.4 + BR/EDR, LE
GPIO pins	34	43	45		20	22	30			26	55	60
SAR ADCs	2 × 12-bit	2 × 13-bit	2 × 12-bit		1 × 12-bit						No	2 × 12-bit
ADC channels	18	20			6		7		4	5	No	16
DAC	2 × 8-bit DAC		No									
USB	No	USB OTG			No						USB OTG	
I²C controllers	2				1						2	
I²S controllers	2	1	2		1						3	2
DMA	PDMA	GDMA				GDMA + UHCI	GDMA					
PWM	LEDC, MCPWM				LEDC						LEDC, MCPWM	
Temperature sensor	Yes				No				Yes	No	Yes	
Thread + Zigbee	No						Yes				No	Yes
Display support	SPI	LCD, SPI			SPI						LCD, SPI, HMI	LCD, SPI
AI/vector ISA	No		Yes		No						Yes	
Storage	4 bit SD, SPI SD				SPI SD				4 bit SD, SPI SD, eMMC	SPI SD only	4 & 8 bit SD, SPI SD, eMMC	4 bit SD, SPI SD, eMMC
CAN Bus	CAN 2.0, SPI				SPI						CAN 2.0, SPI	
Secure Boot	V1, V2	V2										
Crypto hardware	No		Yes		No				Yes		Yes	
Other features	I²S camera	hatI²S and PDM mic	PDM mic		No						Advanced audio	

== QFN packaged chip and module ==
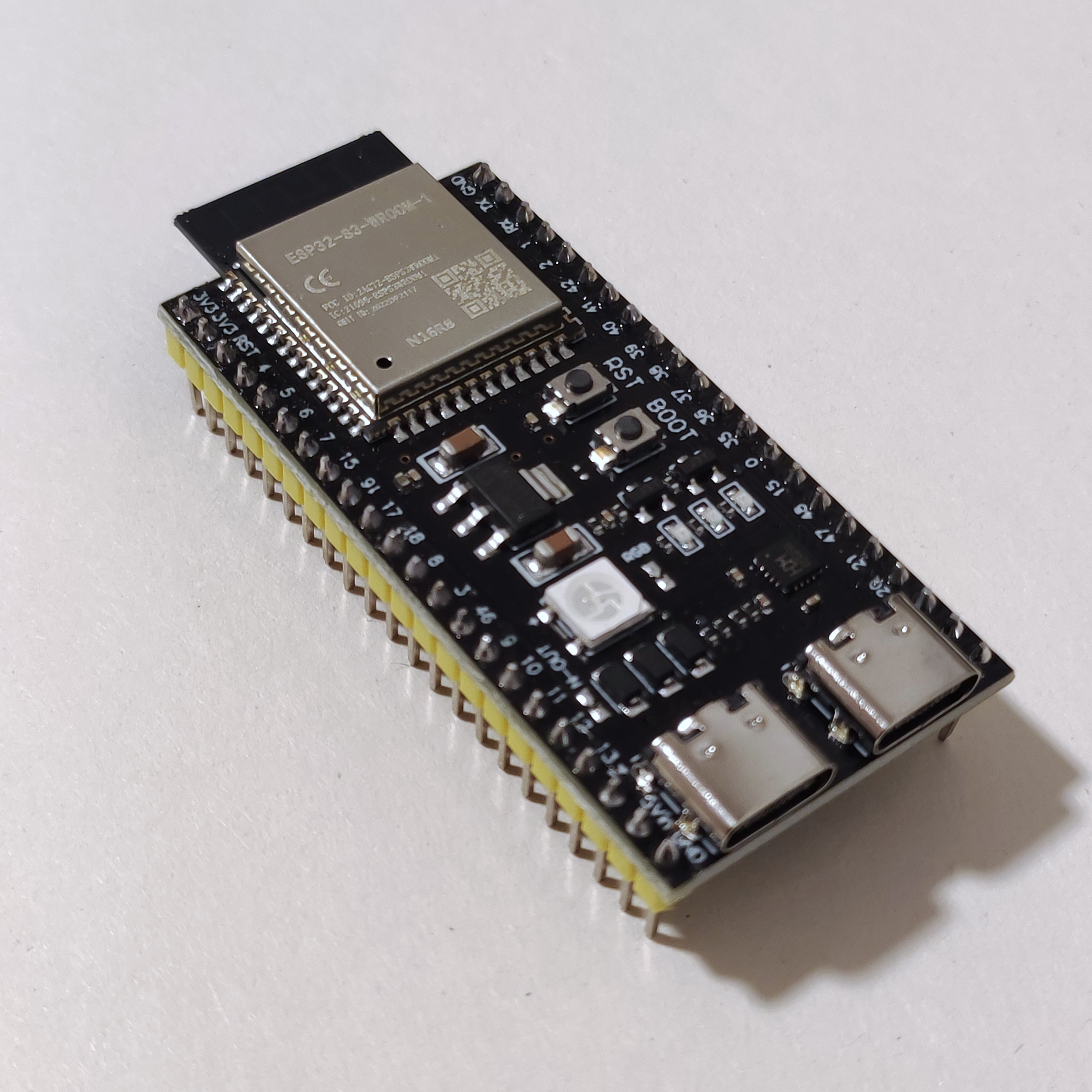
ESP32-S3-Wroom-1 board

ESP32 is housed in quad-flat no-leads (QFN) packages of varying sizes with 49 pads. Specifically, 48 connection pads along the sides and one large thermal pad (connected to ground) on the bottom.

=== Chips ===
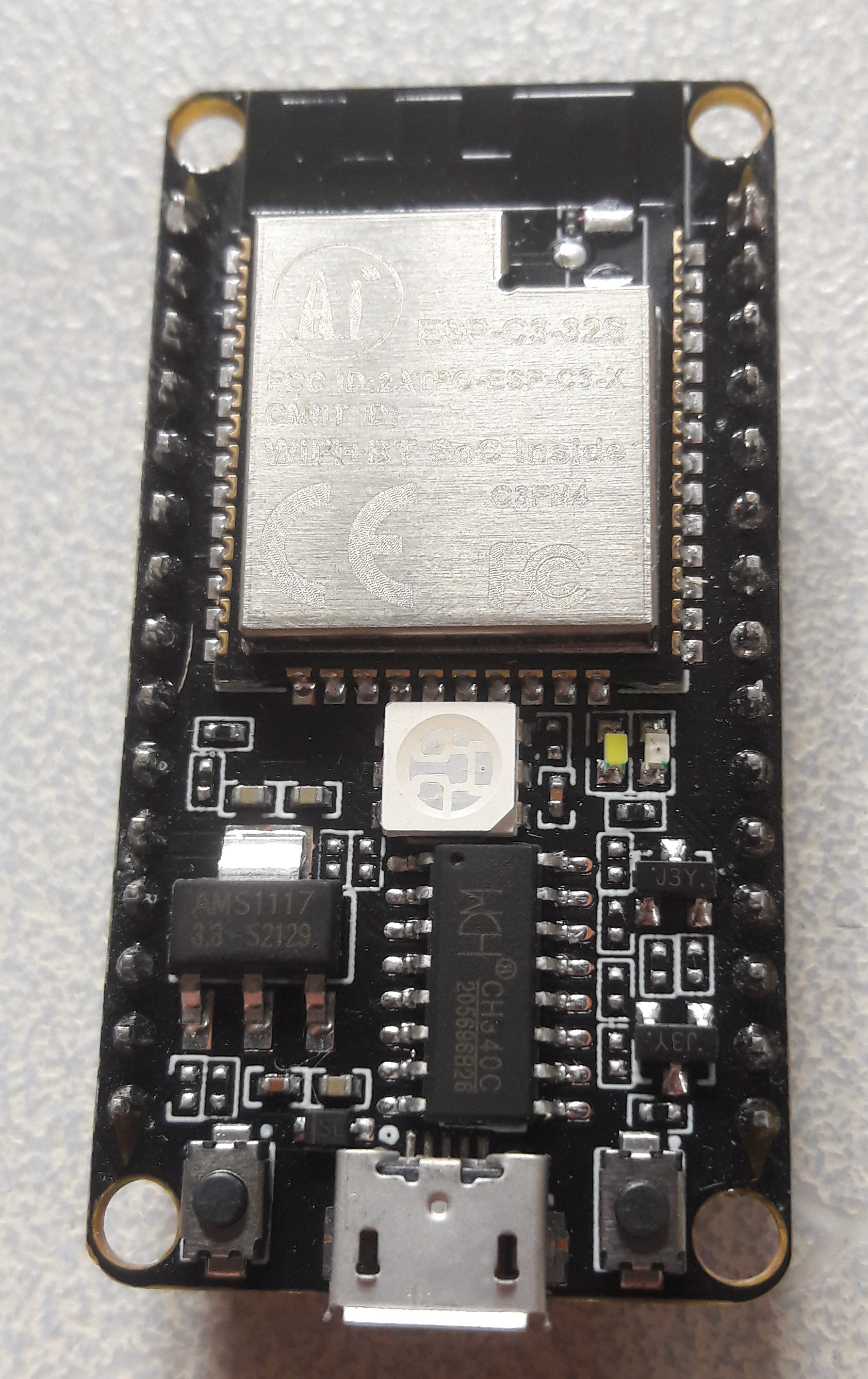
NodeMCU board with an ESP32-C3-32S

The ESP32 system on a chip integrated circuit is packaged in both 6 mm × 6 mm and 5 mm × 5 mm sized QFN packages.

Series	Identifier	Processor cores	Processor speed (MHz)	Embedded flash memory (MiB)	Embedded PSRAM memory (MiB)	GPIOs	Package size	Description
ESP32	ESP31B	2	240	0	0	34	6 mm × 6 mm	Pre-release SoC used for beta testing; no longer available.
ESP32	ESP32-D0WDQ6	2	240	0	0	34	6 mm × 6 mm	Initial production release chip of the ESP32 series. Not Recommended for New Designs (NRND).
ESP32	ESP32-D0WD	2	240	0	0	34	5 mm × 5 mm	Smaller physical package variation similar to ESP32-D0WDQ6. Not Recommended for New Designs (NRND).
ESP32	ESP32-D0WDQ6-V3	2	240	0	0	34	6 mm × 6 mm	Introduces some fixes to ESP32-D0WDQ6. Not Recommended for New Designs (NRND).
ESP32	ESP32-D2WD	2	160	2	0	34	5 mm × 5 mm	2 MiB (16 Mibit) embedded flash memory variation. Removed. Not Recommended for New Designs (NRND).
ESP32	ESP32-S0WD	1	160	0	0	34	5 mm × 5 mm	Single-core processor variation. Not Recommended for New Designs (NRND).
ESP32	ESP32-D0WD-V3	2	240	0	0	34	5 mm × 5 mm	Introduces some fixes to ESP32-D0WD.
ESP32	ESP32-D0WDR2-V3	2	240	0	2	34	5 mm × 5 mm	
ESP32	ESP32-U4WDH	2	240	4	0	34	5 mm × 5 mm	Single-core processor and 4 MiB (32 Mibit) embedded flash memory variation. Also 1 CPU 160 MHz variant existed.
ESP32-S2	ESP32-S2	1	240	0	0	43	7 mm × 7 mm	With USB OTG.
ESP32-S2	ESP32-S2R2	1	240	0	2	43	7 mm × 7 mm	With USB OTG.
ESP32-S2	ESP32-S2FH2	1	240	2	0	43	7 mm × 7 mm	With USB OTG.
ESP32-S2	ESP32-S2FH4	1	240	4	0	43	7 mm × 7 mm	With USB OTG.
ESP32-S2	ESP32-S2FN4R2	1	240	4	2	43	7 mm × 7 mm	With USB OTG.
ESP32-S3	ESP32-S3	2	240	0	0	45	7 mm × 7 mm	With USB OTG. With 3.3V and 1.8V VDD_SPI voltage.
ESP32-S3	ESP32-S3R2	2	240	0	2	45	7 mm × 7 mm	With USB OTG.
ESP32-S3	ESP32-S3R8	2	240	0	8	45	7 mm × 7 mm	With USB OTG.
ESP32-S3	ESP32-S3R8V	2	240	0	8	45	7 mm × 7 mm	With USB OTG. With 1.8V VDD_SPI voltage.
ESP32-S3	ESP32-S3FN8	2	240	8	0	45	7 mm × 7 mm	With USB OTG.
ESP32-S3	ESP32-S3FH4R2	2	240	4	2	45	7 mm × 7 mm	With USB OTG.
ESP32-C2	ESP8684H1	1	120	1	0	14	4 mm × 4 mm	With Bluetooth 5.
ESP32-C2	ESP8684H2	1	120	2	0	14	4 mm × 4 mm	With Bluetooth 5.
ESP32-C2	ESP8684H4	1	120	4	0	14	4 mm × 4 mm	With Bluetooth 5.
ESP32-C3	ESP32-C3	1	160	0	0	22	5 mm × 5 mm	With Bluetooth 5.
ESP32-C3	ESP32-C3FN4	1	160	4	0	22	5 mm × 5 mm	Not Recommended for New Designs (NRND).
ESP32-C3	ESP32-C3FH4	1	160	4	0	22	5 mm × 5 mm	With Bluetooth 5.
ESP32-C3	ESP32-C3FH4AZ	1	160	4	0	16	5 mm × 5 mm	With Bluetooth 5. SPI0/SPI1 pins for flash connection are not bonded.
ESP32-C3	ESP-Shelly-C38F	1	160	8	0	11	5 mm × 5 mm	With Bluetooth 5. only for the manufacturer Shelly
ESP32-C3	ESP8686H4	1	160	4	0	15	4 mm × 4 mm	Not released.
ESP32-C3	ESP8685H2	1	160	2	0	15	4 mm × 4 mm	With Bluetooth 5.
ESP32-C3	ESP8685H4	1	160	4	0	15	4 mm × 4 mm	With Bluetooth 5.
ESP32-C5	ESP32-C5HF4	1H, 1L	240	4	Off-pkg	29	6 mm × 6 mm	Ultra-low-power SoC w. Wi-Fi 6 (802.11ax), Zigbee & Thread (802.15.4).
ESP32-C5	ESP32-C5HR8	1H, 1L	240	Off-pkg	8	29	6 mm × 6 mm	Ultra-low-power SoC w. Wi-Fi 6 (802.11ax), Zigbee & Thread (802.15.4).
ESP32-C6	ESP32-C6	1	160	0	0	30	5 mm × 5 mm	With Wi-Fi 6 and Bluetooth 5.
ESP32-C6	ESP32-C6FH4	1	160	4	0	22	5 mm × 5 mm	With Wi-Fi 6 and Bluetooth 5.
ESP32-H2	ESP32-H2FH2	1	96	2	0	19	4 mm × 4 mm	With Bluetooth 5 and Bluetooth Mesh.
ESP32-H2	ESP32-H2FH4	1	96	4	0	19	4 mm × 4 mm	With Bluetooth 5 and Bluetooth Mesh.
ESP32-P4	ESP32-P4NRW16	2H, 1L	360	Off-pkg up to 64MB	16	55	10 mm × 10 mm	Powerful image and voice processing
ESP32-P4	ESP32-P4NRW32	2H, 1L	360	Off-pkg up to 64MB	32	55	10 mm × 10 mm	Powerful image and voice processing

In 2020, chips ESP32-D0WDQ6 and ESP32-D0WD also got a V3 version (ESP32 ECO V3), which fixes some of the bugs and introduces improvements over the previous versions.

=== Modules ===
The ESP32 PICO system in package modules combine an ESP32 silicon chip, crystal oscillator, flash memory chip, filter capacitors, and RF matching links into a single 7 mm × 7 mm sized QFN package.

The first released PICO was the ESP32-PICO-D4 with 2 CPUs at 240 MHz, 4MiB internal flash, a 40 MHz oscillator and 34 GPIOs.

Later, in 2020, the ESP32-PICO-V3 and ESP32-PICO-V3-02 modules were introduced both based on the ESP32 ECO V3 wafer.

In 2022 the ESP32-S3-PICO-1 module was introduced with USB OTG and internal PSRAM.

Identifier	Processor cores	Processor speed (MHz)	Embedded flash memory (MiB)	Embedded PSRAM memory (MiB)	GPIOs	Package size	Description
ESP32-PICO-D4	2	240	4	0	34	7 mm × 7 mm	Includes ESP32 chip, crystal oscillator, flash memory, filter capacitors, and RF matching links.
ESP32-PICO-V3	2	240	4	0	31	7 mm × 7 mm	Based on ESP32 with ECO V3 wafer.
ESP32-PICO-V3-02	2	240	8	2	29	7 mm × 7 mm	Based on ESP32 with ECO V3 wafer.
ESP32-S3-PICO-1-N8R2	2	240	8	2	39	7 mm × 7 mm	Includes USB OTG.
ESP32-S3-PICO-1-N8R8	2	240	8	8	39	7 mm × 7 mm	Includes USB OTG.

== Printed circuit boards ==
=== Surface-mount module boards ===
ESP32 based surface-mount printed circuit board modules directly contain the ESP32 SoC and are designed to be easily integrated onto other circuit boards. Meandered inverted-F antenna designs are used for the PCB trace antennas on the modules listed below. In addition to flash memory, some modules include pseudostatic RAM (pSRAM).

Vendor	Name	Antenna	Flash memory (MiB)	PSRAM (MiB)	Description
Espressif	ESP-WROOM-03	PCB trace	4	0	Discontinued. Limited distribution, pre-production module created by Espressif for beta testing purposes; this module used the ESP31B, the beta testing chip for the ESP32 series. FCC Part 15.247 tested (FCC ID: 2AC7Z-ESP32).
Espressif	ESP32-WROOM-32	PCB trace	4	0	First publicly available ESP32 module board created by Espressif. FCC Part 15.247 tested (FCC ID: 2AC7Z-ESPWROOM32). Based on ESP32-D0WDQ6 chip. Originally named "ESP-WROOM-32".
Espressif	ESP32-WROOM-32E	PCB trace	4,8,16	0	Same as ESP32-WROOM-32 but with the Eco V3 processor revisions
Espressif	ESP32-WROOM-32D	PCB trace	4	0	Revision of the ESP-WROOM-32 module which uses an ESP32-D0WD chip instead of an ESP32-D0WDQ6 chip. Originally named "ESP-WROOM-32D".
Espressif	ESP32-SOLO-1	PCB trace	4	0	Similar to the ESP32-WROOM-32D module, but uses the single-core ESP32-S0WD chip instead of the dual-core ESP32-D0WD.
Espressif	ESP32-WROOM-32U	U.FL socket	4	0	Alternative to the ESP-WROOM-32D module which has a U.FL connector for external antenna in lieu of a PCB trace antenna.
Espressif	ESP32-WROVER	PCB trace	4	4	ESP32 module board with 4 MiB pSRAM created by Espressif. FCC part 15.247 tested (FCC ID 2AC7Z-ESP32WROVER). Uses 40 MHz crystal oscillator. Does not include U.FL connector. Based on ESP32-D0WDQ6 chip. Since June 2018, new modules have been upgraded to 8 MiB pSRAM.
Espressif	ESP32-WROVER-I	U.FL socket, PCB trace	4	4	Variation of ESP32-WROVER module configured to use an on-board U.FL compatible connector. PCB trace antenna not connected by default.
Espressif	ESP32-WROVER-B	PCB trace	4	8	Revision of ESP32-WROVER module with 8 MiB pSRAM (instead of 4 MiB pSRAM) operating at 3.3V (instead of 1.8V in previous versions) and ESP32-D0WD (instead of ESP32-D0WDQ6). FCC part 15.247 tested (FCC ID 2AC7Z-ESP32WROVERB). Does not include U.FL connector. (Custom order option for flash capacity of 8 MiB or 16 MiB also available.)
Espressif	ESP32-WROVER-IB	U.FL socket, PCB trace	4	8	Variation of ESP32-WROVER-B module configured to use an on-board U.FL compatible connector. PCB trace antenna not connected by default.
Espressif	ESP32-WROVER-E	PCB trace	4,8,16	2,8	Revision of ESP32-WROVER module with 2 or 8 MiB pSRAM (instead of 4 MiB pSRAM) operating at 3.3V (instead of 1.8V in previous versions) and ESP32-D0WD-V3, or in 2MB pSRAM models, ESP32-D0WDR2-V3. FCC part 15.247 tested (FCC ID 2AC7Z-ESP32WROVERE). Does not include U.FL connector. (Custom order option for flash capacity of 2 MiB, 8 MiB, or 16 MiB also available.)
Espressif	ESP32-WROVER-IE	U.FL socket, PCB trace	4,8,16	2,8	Variation of ESP32-WROVER-E module configured to use an on-board U.FL compatible connector. PCB trace antenna not connected by default.
Espressif	ESP32-PICO-V3-ZERO	PCB trace	4	0	Based on ESP32-PICO-V3 SiP. It is designed as a module for Alexa Connect Kit (ACK) and connecting with Amazon Alexa.
Ai-Thinker	ESP32-S	PCB trace	4	0	Ai-Thinker's equivalent to Espressif's ESP-WROOM-32 module. (Same form factor and general specifications.) Previously branded as "ESP-32S" with the hyphen before "32S", the initial release of the ESP-32S module replaced the previously announced, but never released, ESP3212 module.
Ai-Thinker	ESP32-A1S	U.FL socket, PCB trace	8	4	Contains an extra AC101 audio codec IC whose IO-pins (line, mic, etc.) are led to the board pins. Comes separately or soldered onto a corresponding audio development board ("ESP32-Audio-Kit").
AnalogLamb	ESP-32S-ALB	PCB trace	4	0	Clone of the ESP-32S module (ESP-WROOM-32 compatible footprint). Seen with a green solder mask coating.
AnalogLamb	ALB-WROOM	PCB trace	16	0	Variation of ESP-32S-ALB with 16 MiB of flash memory.
AnalogLamb	ALB32-WROVER	PCB trace	4	4	ESP32 module board with 4 MiB pSRAM with the same footprint as the ESP-WROOM-32 module.
DFRobot	ESP-WROOM-32	PCB trace	4	0	Module board similar to Espressif Systems's ESP-WROOM-32, but is not FCC certified, and uses 26 MHz or 32 kHz crystal oscillator.
eBox & Widora	ESP32-Bit	Ceramic, U.FL socket	4	0	Module has a ceramic antenna and an U.FL antenna connector. This module has a different footprint than the ESP-WROOM-32/ESP-32S modules.
Goouuu Tech	ESP-32F	PCB trace	4	0	Module board similar to Espressif Systems's ESP-WROOM-32. FCC certified (ID 2AM77-ESP-32F).
IntoRobot	W32	PCB trace	4	0	Module similar in appearance to Espressif's ESP-WROOM-32, but footprint pinout differs.
IntoRobot	W33	Ceramic, U.FL socket	4	0	Differs from IntoRobot W32 module in its antenna configuration.
ITEAD	PSH-C32	PCB trace	1	0	Module has unusually small flash memory on board. Also, footprint is unique and differs from all other ESP32 modules.
Pycom	W01	(Not included.)	8	4	OEM module version of the WiPy 2.0. Supports Wi-Fi and Bluetooth. FCC ID 2AJMTWIPY01R.
Pycom	L01	(Not included.)	8	4	OEM module version of the LoPy. Supports Wi-Fi, Bluetooth, and LoRa. FCC ID 2AJMTLOPY01R.
Pycom	L04	(Not included.)	8	4	OEM module version of the LoPy4. Supports Wi-Fi, Bluetooth, LoRa, and Sigfox.
Pycom	S01	(Not included.)	8	4	Discontinued. OEM module version of the SiPy. Supports Wi-Fi, Bluetooth, and Sigfox (14 dBm and 22 dBm).
Pycom	G01	(Not included.)	8	4	OEM module version of the GPy. Supports Cellular LTE-CAT M1/NB1, Wi-Fi and Bluetooth.
u-blox	NINA-W131	(Not included.)	2	0	Belongs to the u-blox NINA-W13 series of Wi-Fi modules.
u-blox	NINA-W132	PIFA	2	0	Belongs to the u-blox NINA-W13 series of Wi-Fi modules. On board planar inverted-F antenna (PIFA) is shaped (cut & bent) metal, not a PCB trace.

=== Development and other boards ===
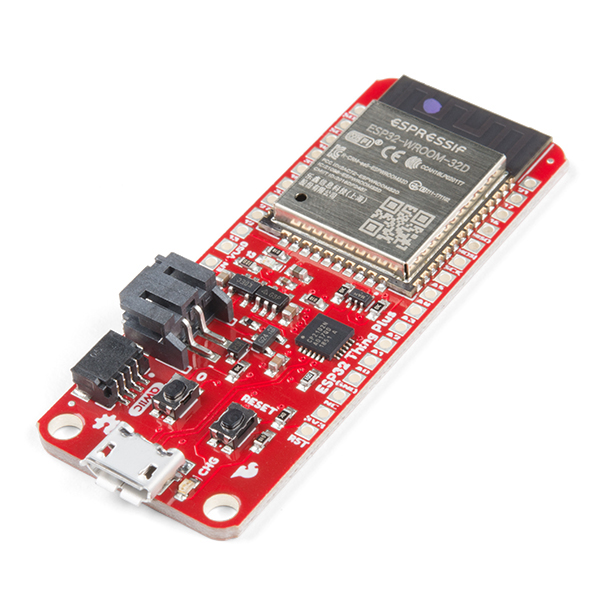
SparkFun Thing Plus – ESP32 WROOM

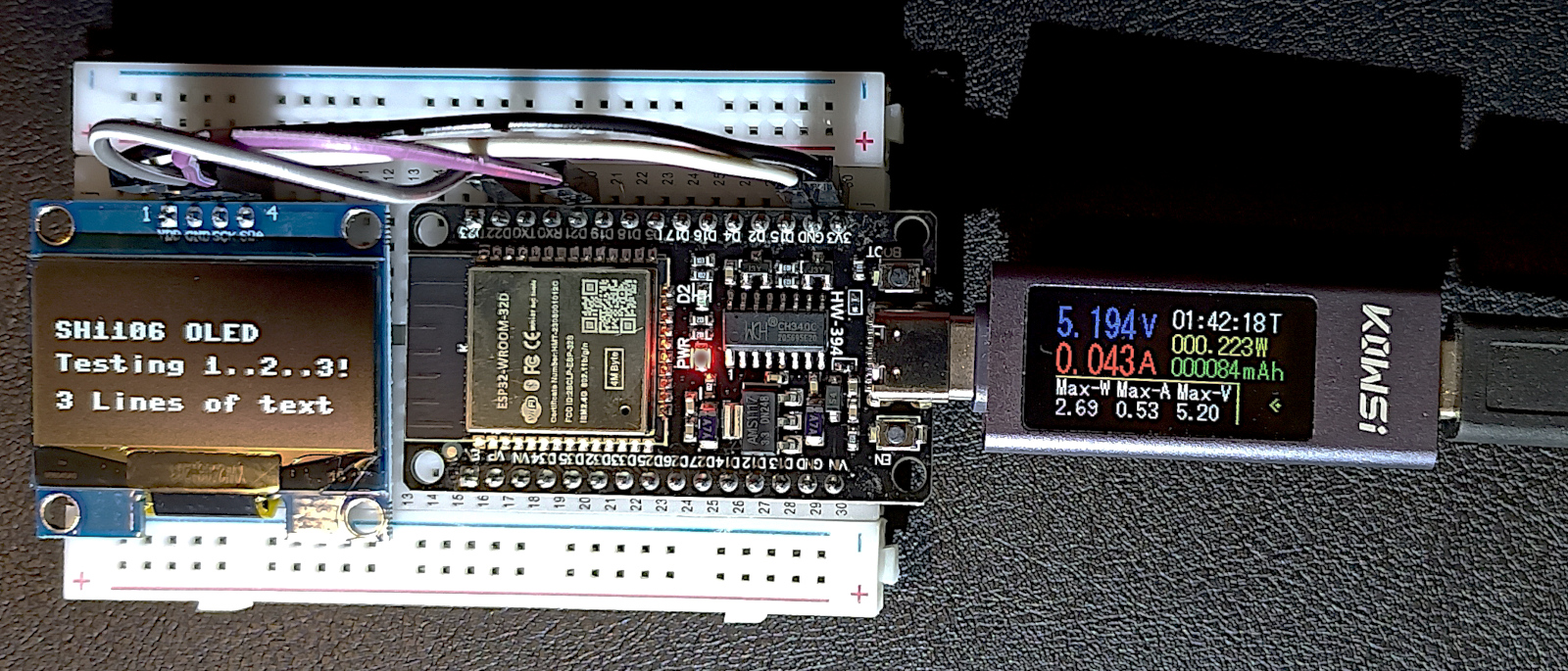
ESP32 dev board, SH1106 OLED display on breadboard with USB power meter

Development and break-out boards extend wiring and may add functionality, often building upon ESP32 module boards and making them easier to use for development purposes, especially with breadboards.

Vendor	Name	Surface-mount module used	Description
Espressif	ESP_Module_Testboard	ESP-WROOM-03	Break-out board included with ESP-WROOM-03 beta modules.
Espressif	ESP32_Demo Board_V2	ESP-WROOM-32	Development & demonstration board created by Espressif.
Espressif	ESP32-DevKitC	ESP32-WROOM-32, v4 comes with ESP32-WROOM-DA(Dual Antenna), ESP32-WROVER or ESP32-Solo (single-core variant)	Compact development board created by Espressif. Silkscreen labeling on PCB reads "Core Board".
Espressif	ESP-WROVER-KIT	ESP-WROOM-32 or ESP32-WROVER	Large development board created by Espressif. Previously named ESP32-DevKitJ.
Espressif	ESP32-PICO-KIT	ESP32-PICO-D4	Small development board with Micro-USB and two header rows of 17 pins. FCC ID 2AC7Z-ESP32PICOKIT.
Adafruit	HUZZAH32	ESP-WROOM-32	Also referred to as the "ESP32 Feather Board", the HUZZAH32 is a compact development board/module that is compatible with the Adafruit Feather family of products.
Ai-Thinker	NodeMCU-32S	ESP-32S	NodeMCU-like development board.
Ai-Thinker	ESP32-CAM	ESP32-S	Compact (27 mm × 40.5 mm) board with ribbon cable Camera Serial Interface with support for 1600 × 1200 pixel OV2640 or 640 × 480 OV7670 camera. Has 9 usable IO pins and microSD card slot.
AnalogLamb	ESP32 Development Board	ESP-32S-ALB or ALB-WROOM	Development board similar to Espressif's ESP32-DevKitC with on board a CP2102 USB/serial bridge. 4 MiB variation uses ESP-32S-ALB; 16 MiB variation uses ALB-WROOM module.
AnalogLamb	Maple ESP32	ESP-32S-ALB	Development board with Arduino-style connections and CP2104 USB/serial interface.
April Brother	ESPea32	†	Development board with perfboard area that may be optionally cut-off.
ArduCAM	ESP32 UNO	ESP-32S	Arduino Uno-like development board based on ESP32 IoT UNO framework with support for SPI ArduCAM, battery pins and uSD card slot.
Arduino	Arduino Nano ESP32	U-Blox NORA-W106-10B (based on ESP32-S3 IC)	Deprecated. Arduino Nano footprint
Banana pi	BPI:bit	ESP-32S	a development for Webduino and Arduino
Banana pi	BPI-UNO32	ESP32-S	a development board for Arduino
DoIT	ESPduino32	ESP-WROOM-32	Full-featured Arduino Uno-like development board compatible with Arduino Shields. It also adds additional SPI & IO pins. The board is a clone of WeMos D1 R32 with a USB Type B socket.
DoIT	ESP32 DEVKIT V1	ESP-WROOM-32	The ESP32 DevKit V1 is probably the most popular among hobbyists and educators for its ease of use and versatility in various electronic projects. The pinout is one of the most copied.
DPTechnics	Walter	ESP32-S3-WROOM-1	The Walter module combines cellular IoT (LTE-M and NB-IoT) and GNSS with the ESP32-S3 with 16MiB flash and 2MiB PSRAM. The module is suited for development as well as for production because of the CE, FCC, UKCA, RCM and IC certifications.
EzSBC	ESP32-01 Breakout and Development Board	ESP-WROOM-32	Full-featured development board with two tri-color LEDs and fits on a breadboard.
Gravitech & MakerAsia	Nano32	†	Development board that directly incorporates the ESP32 chip.
HydraBus	HydraESP32	ESP-WROOM-32 or ESP-32S	HydraESP32 HydraBus v1.1 Rev1 shield/breakout board for ESP-WROOM-32 or ESP-32S. This shield can be used with or without a HydraBus board.
Noduino	Quantum	†	Arduino-style development board that directly incorporates the ESP32 chip.
Olimex	ESP32-Gateway	ESP32-WROOM32	Wi-Fi/Bluetooth/Ethernet
Olimex	ESP32-DevKit-LiPo	ESP32-WROOM-32	pin compatible with ESP32-CoreBoard, but adds Lipo charger and ability to work on LiPo.
Olimex	ESP32-POE-ISO	ESP32-WROOM-32/UE	Wi-Fi/Bluetooth/Ethernet development board with Power over Ethernet and 2W of isolated DC power
Olimex	ESP32-POE	ESP32-WROOM-32	Wi-Fi/Bluetooth/Ethernet development board with Power over Ethernet
Olimex	ESP32-PRO	†	Wi-Fi/Bluetooth and PIC32MX270F256DT microcontroller and 32 Mb SPI flash and 32 Mb PSRAM. ESP32-PRO-C includes external crypto engine with ATECC508A
Olimex	ESP32-EVB	ESP32-WROOM32	Wi-Fi/Bluetooth/Ethernet development board with MicroSD, CAN, IR, LiPo, and two relays.
Olimex	ESP32-ADF	ESP32-WROVER-B	audio development framework board with stereo microphones, speakers, audio output jack.
Pycom	WiPy	†	MicroPython programmable Wi-Fi & Bluetooth IoT development platform with a 1 km Wi-Fi range. WiPy versions 2.0 and 3.0 use ESP32.
Pycom	LoPy	†	Triple network Pycom board featuring LoRa, Wi-Fi (1 km range), and BLE.
Pycom	LoPy4	?	Quadruple network Pycom board featuring LoRa, Sigfox, Wi-Fi (1 km range), and BLE.
Pycom	SiPy	†	Triple network Pycom board featuring Sigfox, Wi-Fi (1 km range), and BLE.
Pycom	GPy	†	Triple network Pycom board featuring LTE-M, Wi-Fi (1 km range), and BLE.
Pycom	FiPy	†	Quintuple network Pycom board featuring LTE-M, LoRa, Sigfox, Wi-Fi (1 km range), and BLE.
SparkFun	ESP32 Thing	†	Compact development board with FTDI FT231x USB/serial interface and LiPo charger built-in.
SunDUINO	ESP32 MiniBoard	ESP-WROOM-32	Breakout compatible with the Espressif ESP32-DevKitC. Lacks on-board USB-UART.
SunDUINO	ESP32 MiniBoard v2	ESP32-Wrover-B/IB	Breakout board with Silabs CP2102, battery charger. Compatible with Espressif DEVkit.
SunDUINO	ESP32 SunDUINO	ESP-WROOM-32 or ESP-32S	Arduino-style development board. Lacks on-board USB-UART.
SwitchDoc Labs	BC24	ESP-WROOM-32	ESP32 Breakout with 24 SK6812RGBW LEDs with Grove Connectors for easy prototyping. Comes with USB-UART and Feather compatible pinout.
Watterott	ESP-WROOM32-Breakout	ESP-WROOM-32	Breakout which is compatible with the Espressif ESP32-DevKitC.
WEMOS	LOLIN32 [Retired]	ESP-WROOM-32	
WEMOS	LOLIN32 Lite [Retired]	†	ESP32-D0WDQ6
WEMOS	LOLIN32 Pro [Retired]	ESP32-WROVER	MicroSD card slot (supports SD and SPI mode)
WEMOS	LOLIN D32	ESP-WROOM-32	
WEMOS	LOLIN D32 Pro	ESP32-WROVER	I2C port, TFT port and Micro SD Card slot (support SPI mode)
Widora	Air	†	Compact ESP32 development board.
MagicBit	Magic Bit Core	ESP-WROOM-32	Compact ESP32 development board with displays and several sensors on board to make learning embedded development convenient.

† ESP32 SoC incorporated directly onto development board; no module board used.

== Programming ==
ESP32 function block diagram

Programming languages, frameworks, platforms, and environments used for ESP32 programming:

- ESP-IDF – Espressif's official IoT Development Framework for the ESP32, ESP32-S, ESP32-C and ESP32-H series of SoCs.
- Arduino-ESP32 – Arduino core for the ESP32, ESP32-S2, ESP32-S3 and ESP32-C3.
- ESP32forth – FORTH implementation for ESP32
- Espruino – JavaScript SDK and firmware closely emulating Node.js
- MicroPython (and CircuitPython) – lean implementation of Python 3 for microcontrollers
- Mongoose OS – an operating system for connected products on microcontrollers; programmable with JavaScript or C. A recommended platform by Espressif Systems, AWS IoT, and Google Cloud IoT.
- mruby and picoruby for the ESP32
- Nim for the ESP32
- NodeMCU – Lua-based firmware
- Rust
- Swift
- Visual Studio Code with the officially supported Espressif Integrated Development Framework (ESP-IDF) Extension
- Zerynth – Python for IoT and microcontrollers, including the ESP32
- Matlab Simulink
- Zig for the ESP32

== Reception and use ==
Commercial, industrial and academic uses of ESP32:

=== Use in commercial devices ===
- Alibaba Group's IoT LED wristband, used by participants at the group's 2017 annual gathering. Each wristband operated as a "pixel", receiving commands for coordinated LED light control, allowing formation of a "live and wireless" screen.
- DingTalk's M1, a biometric attendance-tracking system.
- Pium, a home fragrance and aromatherapy device.
- HardKernel's Odroid Go, an ESP32 based handheld gaming device kit made to commemorate Odroid's 10th anniversary.
- Playdate, a handheld video game console jointly developed by Panic Inc. and Teenage Engineering.
- Octopus Energy Mini, an ESP32-C6 based real-time energy monitor.
- Mysa smart thermostats, based on ESP32-WROOM.
- Low-end UniFi switches from Ubiquiti, based on ESP32-D0WD-V3.
- Xteink X4, a compact e-ink reader with support for community firmware.

=== Use in industrial devices ===
- TECHBASE's Moduino X series X1 and X2 modules are ESP32-WROVER / ESP32-WROVER-B based computers for industrial automation and monitoring, supporting digital inputs/outputs, analog inputs, and various computer networking interfaces.
- NORVI IIOT Industrial Devices with ESP32-WROVER / ESP32-WROVER-B SOC for industrial automation and monitoring with digital inputs, analog inputs, relay outputs and multiple communications interfaces. Supports LoRa and Nb-IoT as expansion modules.

=== Academic uses ===
- ESP32 devices are utilized in educational settings and academic research projects. Additionally, ESP32 is used in DIY projects such as building low-cost drones. The DJI Robomaster TT, an educational variant of the Ryze Tello drone, is equipped with an ESP32.

== Undocumented HCI commands in ESP32 ==
In March 2025, researchers from Tarlogic Security identified undocumented Host Controller Interface (HCI) commands in the ESP32 Bluetooth firmware, prompting discussions about their functionality and potential implications. This discovery was presented on March 6, 2025, at the RootedCON conference by the Tarlogic Security team.

The identified commands, such as Write Memory (0xFC02), are vendor-specific HCI commands used primarily for debugging and testing purposes. These types of commands are common in Bluetooth controller implementations to assist with development and troubleshooting. They are not part of the standard HCI command set and are typically used in controlled environments. While initially described as a "backdoor," further clarifications labeled them as "undocumented debugging features." These commands are not accessible remotely via standard Bluetooth connections but could be interacted with if an entity has physical access to the device or operates in an HCI-UART configuration.

Espressif Systems provided clarification regarding these commands, stating that they are intended for debugging and do not pose a security risk under normal operating conditions. The company emphasized that these commands cannot be triggered remotely and are not used in standard Bluetooth operations. These commands are present only in ESP32 chips and are not included in the ESP32-C, ESP32-S, and ESP32-H series. To address concerns raised within the security community, Espressif announced that future versions of the ESP-IDF would include updates to restrict access to these debugging commands and improve documentation for vendor-specific HCI commands. These actions aim to provide additional transparency and ensure developers are well-informed about available functionalities.

== See also ==
- ESP8266 – predecessor 32-bit microcontroller and boards by the same vendor
- Internet of things
