= Pimoroni =

British multinational hobbyist electronics company

Pimoroni Ltd.
- Type: Private
- Industry: Electronics; Computing; Robotics
- Founded: 2012; 14 years ago in Sheffield, United Kingdom
- Founders: Jon Williamson; Paul Beech
- Headquarters: Sheffield, United Kingdom
- Website: pimoroni.com

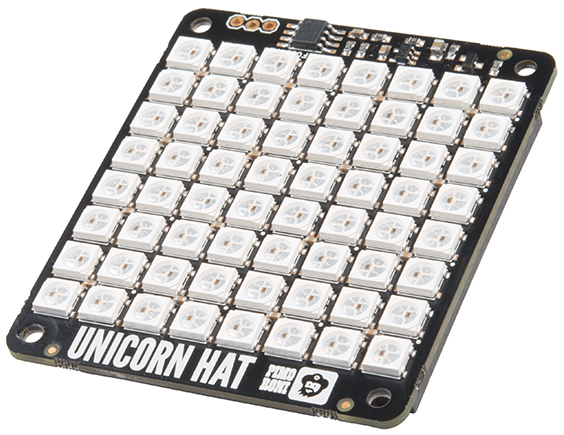
Pimoroni Unicorn HAT for the Raspberry Pi containing a 8 × 8 RGB LED array

Pimoroni Ltd is a hobbyist electronics company based in Sheffield, South Yorkshire, UK.

== History ==
The company was founded in 2012 by Jon Williamson and Paul Beech. The name "Pimoroni" stands for Pirate, Monkey, Robot, Ninja.

In 2017, Pimoroni was named the second fastest growing manufacturing company in the UK by the University of Sheffield. Within the same year, the company opened its first international branch in Essen, Germany.

After negotiating a 10-year lease on a new headquarters building in 2021, the company consolidated all its staff and operations onto one site. The relocation also doubled its production, research and development, and warehousing space.

== Products ==
Through an online store, and at community events, they are a re-seller for a number of electronics and education brands, as well as manufacturing a range of electronics and associated products. Their original product was an Acrylic plastic case for the Raspberry Pi computer (which has now sold in excess of 175,000 units), and their range now includes a selection of add-on boards and components for this and other small computers.

Their 'Picade' arcade machine kit was the UK's first Kickstarter campaign.

By July 1, 2019, they successfully raised £93,480 on Kickstarter to fund their new retro-style console and open-source SDK, known as "32blit.".
