= Thumby (console) =

Miniature keychain sized game console

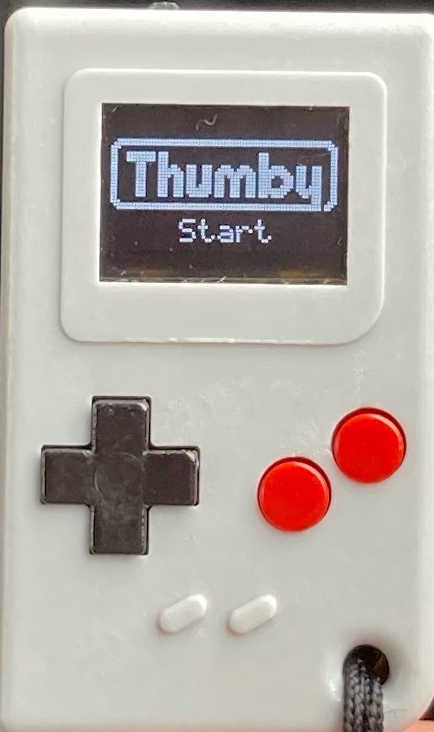
- Thumby game console close-up
- Developer: TinyCircuits
- Manufacturer: TinyCircuits
- Type: Handheld game console
- Generation: Ninth
- Released: 2022
- Introductory price: $20–35
- Media: Digital distribution
- System on a chip: RP2040
- CPU: 2 ARM Cortex-M0+ cores @ Up to 133 MHz
- Memory: 264 KB (SRAM)
- Storage: 1.4 MB (advertised as 2 MB)
- Display: 72×40 1-bit OLED
- Sound: Piezoelectric speaker
- Connectivity: Link cable
- Power: 40 mAh Lithium polymer battery
- Online services: Thumby Arcade
- Dimensions: 1.2 by 0.7 by 0.3 inches (30.5 mm × 17.8 mm × 7.6 mm)
- Weight: 4.7 grams (0.17 oz)
- Marketing target: Programming education
- Predecessor: Pocket Arcade
- Website: thumby.us
- Language: MicroPython, Arduino

The Thumby is a small Bumble Bee-sized programmable game console produced by TinyCircuits of Akron, Ohio and funded by a Kickstarter campaign. The console measures 1.2 by 0.7 by 0.3 inches (30.5 mm × 17.8 mm × 7.6 mm).

== History ==
The first concept for the Thumby originated roughly around 2015 or 2016. An early version of the system was shown at the 2016 Bay Area Maker Faire.

A Kickstarter crowdfunding campaign to raise money for the console began on September 28, 2021. The company projected a production of at least 10,000 Thumby consoles despite the 2020–2023 global chip shortage. A stated goal was to ship consoles to backers by February 2022, with plans to ship some early units in Fall 2021. The console shipped in 2022. The Verge reported on a follow-up Thumby Color console Kickstarter in August 2024. Listed improvements include a color display, improved processor, and a haptic feedback motor. The Thumby Color entered the market in 2025.

== Games ==
The Thumby includes six preloaded games:

- TinySaur/Saur Run
- Thumgeon
- TinyTennis/Tennis
- Annelid
- Space Debris
- TinyBlocks/TinyTris

Additional games can be downloaded from the internet on a personal computer, then loaded onto the console over USB.

== Hardware ==
The Thumby is powered by a Raspberry Pi RP2040 microcontroller. The console provides 2MB of onboard storage. MicroPython is supported with a web based development environment.

A small 0.38 by 0.27 inches (9.7 mm × 6.9 mm) 72×40 pixel 1-bit OLED panel is used as the display. A buzzer is also included for simple audio feedback.

A microUSB port is used to connect the console with computers, as well as to support the Thumby link cable. This port is also used to charge the lithium polymer battery, which provides about 2 hours of operational runtime with a capacity of 40 mAh.

The system is notable for its small size, measuring at 1.2 by 0.7 by 0.3 inches (30.5 mm × 17.8 mm × 7.6 mm). The console can be mounted on a keychain. The system has a mass of 4.7 grams (0.17 oz).

The console casing was made in a variety of colors including gray, dark gray, blue, pink, gold, green, and clear.
