= Fwupd =

Linux software that manages firmware updates

fwupd
- Original author: Richard Hughes
- Release: 17 March 2015; 11 years ago
Stable release
- 2.0: 2.1.8 / 24 September 2026; 27 days ago
- Written in: C
- Operating system: Linux
- Type: firmware updates for Linux-based systems
- License: LGPL v2.1
- Website: fwupd.org
- Repository: github.com/fwupd/fwupd/

fwupd is an open-source daemon for managing the installation of firmware updates on Linux-based systems, developed by GNOME maintainer Richard Hughes. Updates can be exposed via a command line tool, or within graphical package managers (such as GNOME Software) via a D-Bus interface.

Fwupd is designed primarily for servicing the Unified Extensible Firmware Interface (UEFI) firmware on supported devices via EFI System Resource Table (ESRT) and UEFI Capsule, which is supported in Linux kernel 4.2 and later. Previously, the initiation of UEFI firmware updates within an operating system could, on most systems, only be performed using Microsoft Windows or DOS-specific software. ESRT allows the firmware to expose updatable components to the operating system, which can pass a UEFI capsule with updated firmware for processing and installation on the next boot.

fwupd can also process other types of firmware update, for example SSD firmware, CPU microcode, and Android firmware. fwupd uses a plugin architecture to support upgrading many different kinds of devices.

== Firmware coverage ==
fwupd can apply UEFI firmware updates through the capsule update on-disk method.

== Adoption ==
Several Linux distributions use fwupd, including:

- RHEL and CentOS 7.4 or newer
- Fedora 22 or newer
- Ubuntu 16.04 (Xenial) or newer
- Debian 9 (Stretch) or newer
- openSUSE 15.0 or newer
- Arch from 2017-06-13

== Linux Vendor Firmware Service ==
The Linux Vendor Firmware Service (LVFS) provides resources and support for helping vendors package their firmware updates to support the use of this framework, and serves as an online repository for obtaining these updates. To provide a test case on systems where ESRT is not yet supported, fwupd is also able to update firmware on the ColorHug color calibrator.

In December 2015, it was revealed that Hughes had been working with a Dell developer to test the system on actual hardware, and that its Dell Edge Gateway product will support firmware servicing via fwupd. Hughes reported that the company was also "considering expanding out the LVFS support to all new models supporting UEFI updates". In August 2018, Lenovo joined the project and provides update support for a wide range of their devices.

In September 2019, Acer joined the project, with initial support for their Aspire A315 model. Starting from December 2019, Google requires that firmware updates can be applied with fwupd for certified Chromebooks.

== See also ==
- Flashrom (utility)
