= SparkFun Electronics =

American electronic components and hardware distributor and manufacturer

- Type: Private
- Industry: Electronics manufacturing and education
- Founded: 2003
- Headquarters: Niwot, Colorado, United States
- Key people: (CEO) Glenn Samala 2016 - Present Nathan Seidle 2003 - 2016
- Number of employees: 150+ (2015)
- Website: www.sparkfun.com

SparkFun Electronics (sometimes known by its abbreviation, SFE) is an electronics retailer in Niwot, Colorado, United States. It manufactures and sells microcontroller development boards and breakout boards.

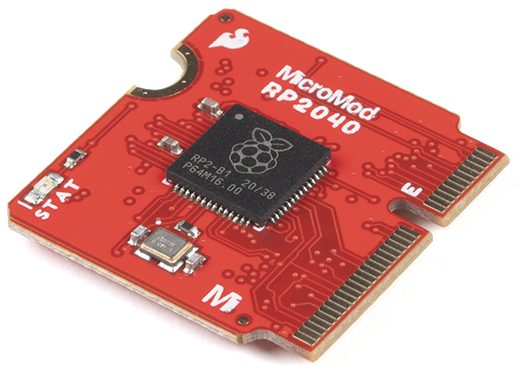
SparkFun MicroMod Pi RP2040 Processor Board

== History ==
SparkFun Electronics was founded in 2003 by Nathan Seidle when he was a Junior at University of Colorado Boulder. Its first products were Olimex printed circuit boards. The name 'SparkFun' came about because one of the founders of SparkFun was testing a development board, and sparks flew out; Fun was chosen because the company's self-stated aim is to educate people about electronics. In January 2011, an education department was formed to outreach to local schools, hackerspaces, and events.

== Open-source hardware ==
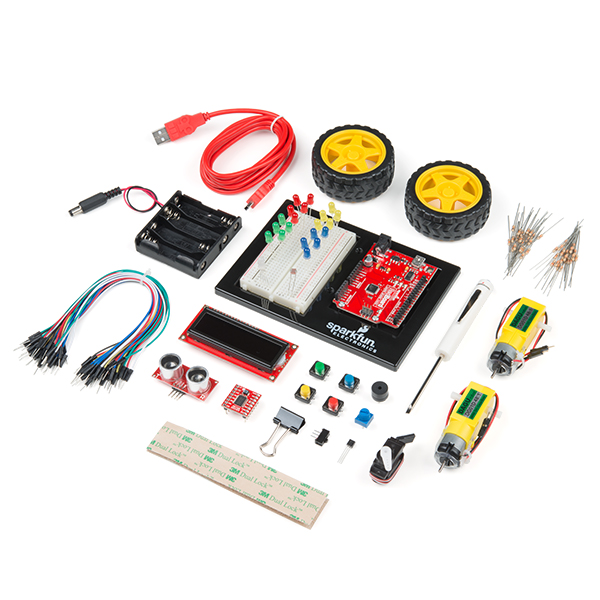
SparkFun's Inventor's Kit, v4.0

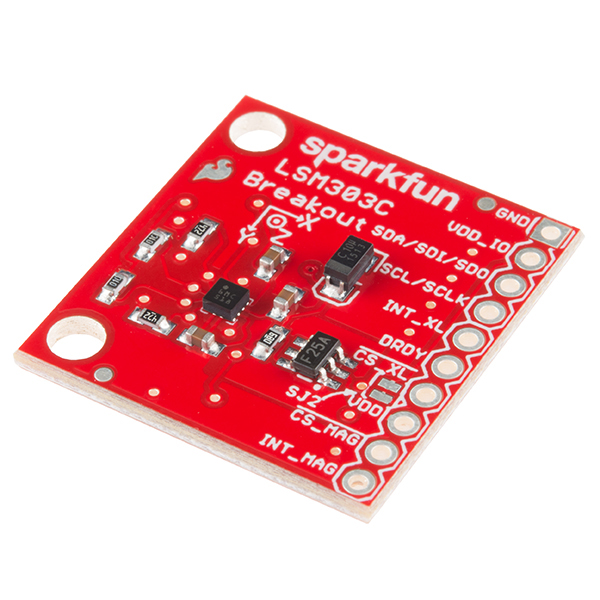
An accelerometer and magnetic compass board from SparkFun

All products designed and produced by SparkFun are released as open-source hardware (OSHW), with schematics, EAGLE files, and datasheets posted on each product page. Product images are licensed under the Creative Commons BY-NC-SA 3.0

During the Open Source Hardware summit in October 2010, SparkFun was one of the contributors in drafting the first OSHW definition.

== Contests ==
=== Antimov ===
This contest was based upon violating the 2nd and 3rd laws of robotics, where a fully automated robot would destroy itself after interacting with props and objects in a performance. The competition was retired in 2011.

=== AVC ===
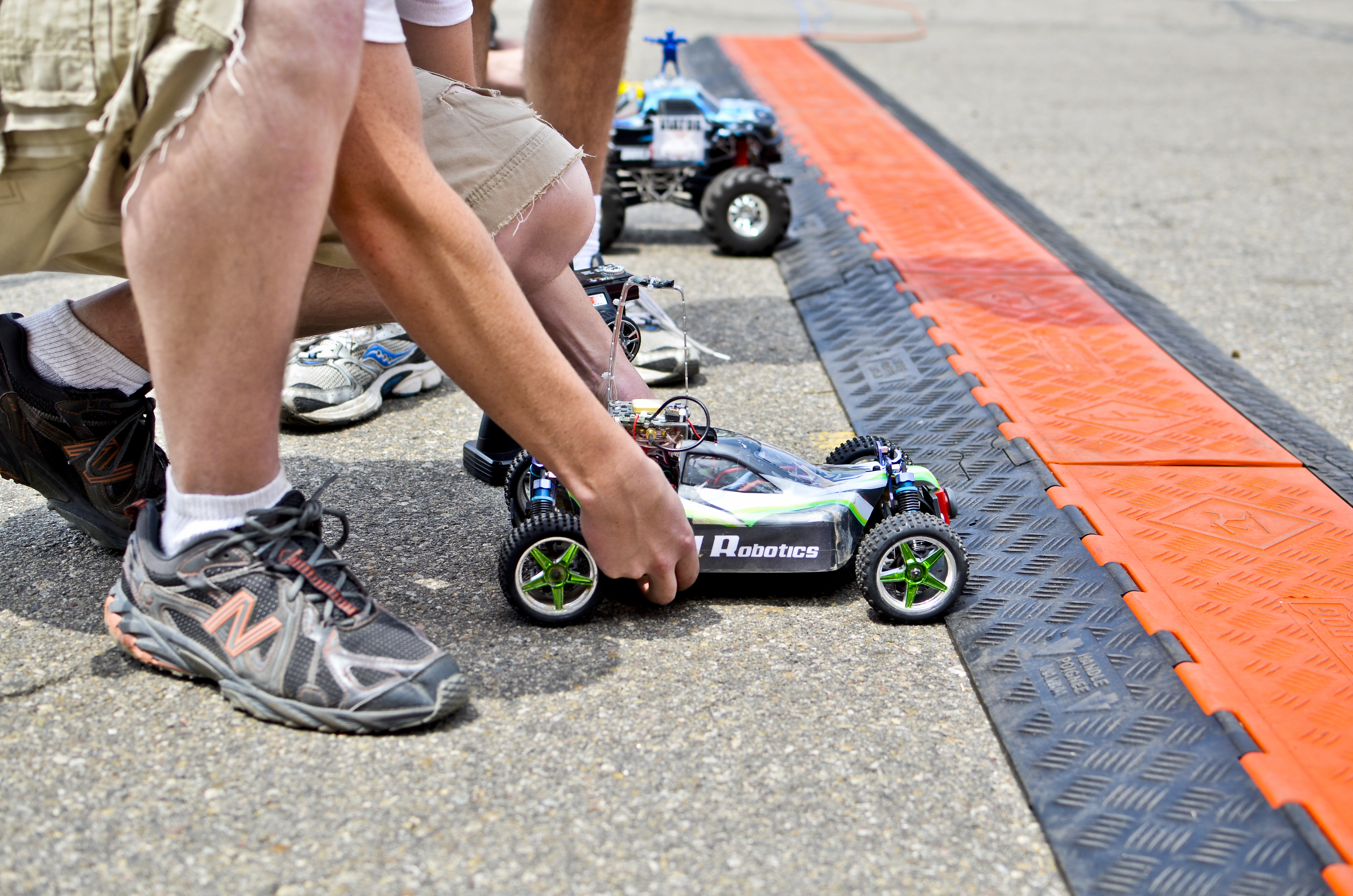
AVC 2012

The Autonomous Vehicle Challenge was a recurring contest held annually by SparkFun. The objective is to build an automated vehicle that can circumnavigate a course without human interaction. As of 2015, aerial vehicles are not allowed. The challenge was retired in 2018.

== Projects ==
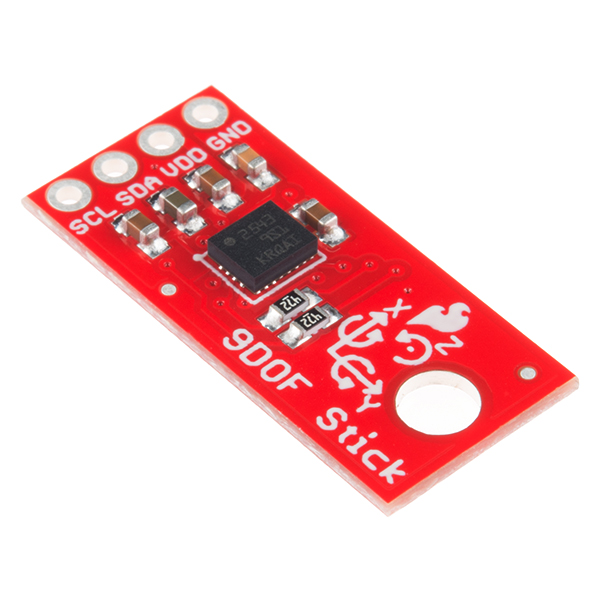
SparkFun 9-DoF IMU SiP stick

SparkFun has become one of the favored suppliers for those without mainstream suppliers as well as the "Maker" community, particularly for the Arduino and related devices.

Whilst many of the non-component products sold by SFE are from other manufacturers, it does manufacture and sell some of its own complete products:

- The Port-o-Rotary phone
- Picture Frame Tetris
- Giant NES controller

== Legal disputes ==
=== Trademark dispute with SPARC International ===
On October 16, 2009, SPARC International sent a cease and desist letter demanding SparkFun stop using the "SparkFun" name and immediately transfer ownership of SparkFun.com to SPARC International. The letter claimed the SparkFun trademark was too visually and phonetically similar for companies in the same industry.

The two companies signed a trademark coexistence agreement on April 2, 2010.

=== Fluke trademark infringement ===
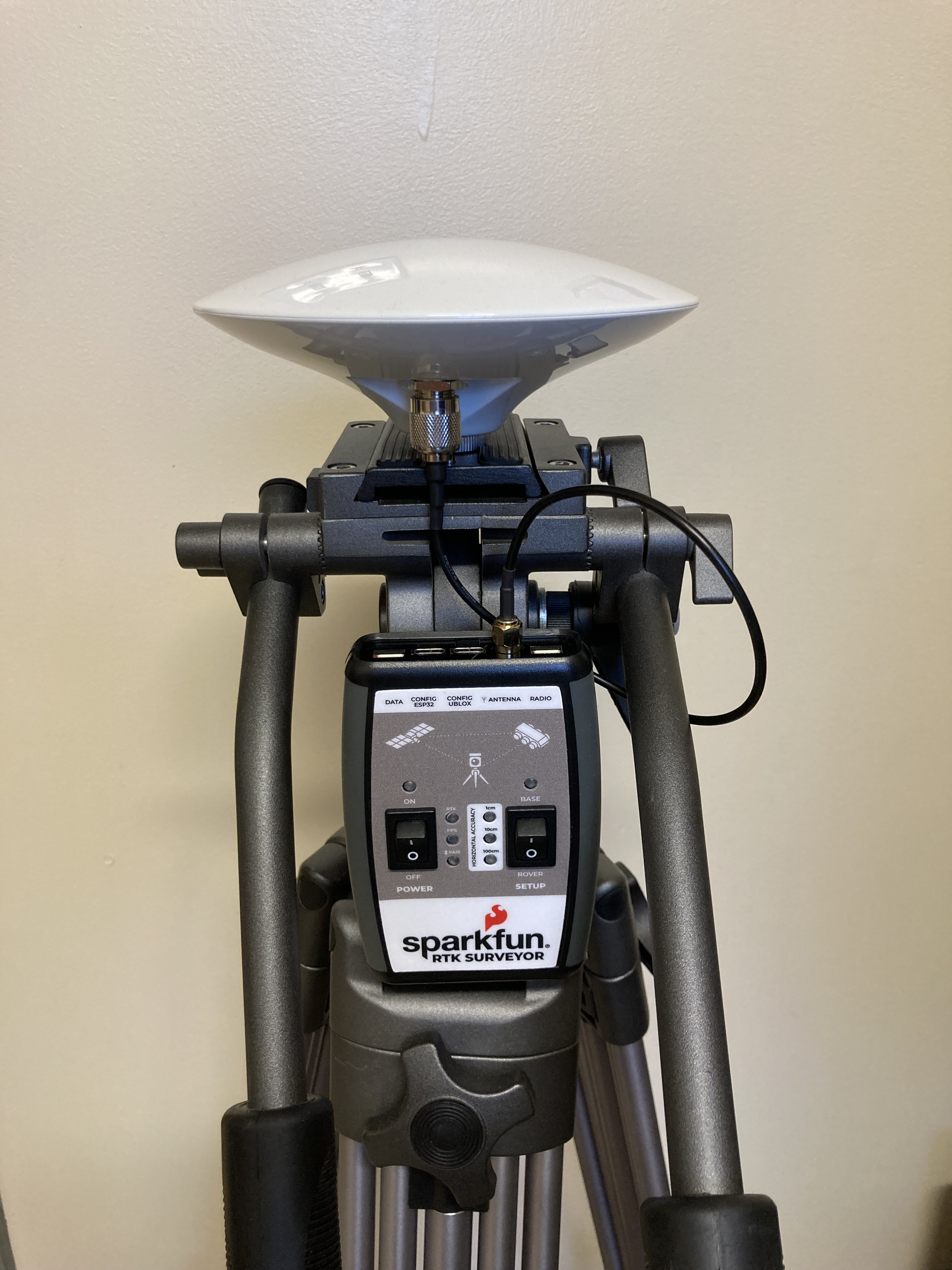
SparkFun RTK Surveyor and L1/L2/L5 band Antenna used in a GIS system.

On March 7, 2014, U.S. Customs and Border Protection informed SparkFun that a shipment of multimeters meant for sale on SparkFun's website had been seized. The Port of Denver deemed that the yellow protective jackets on the imported multimeters too closely resembled the trade dress of Fluke Corporation's competing multimeters. Rather than pay the cost of shipping the imported multimeters back, SparkFun chose to have them destroyed. In a letter to SparkFun, Fluke announced that they would be supplying the company with a shipment of genuine Fluke products and equipment as a gesture of goodwill and support for the maker movement, which SparkFun accepted.

== See also ==
- Adafruit Industries
- Digi-Key
- Newark (company)
- Mouser Electronics
- RS Components
