= NS 700 =

Series of steam locomotives

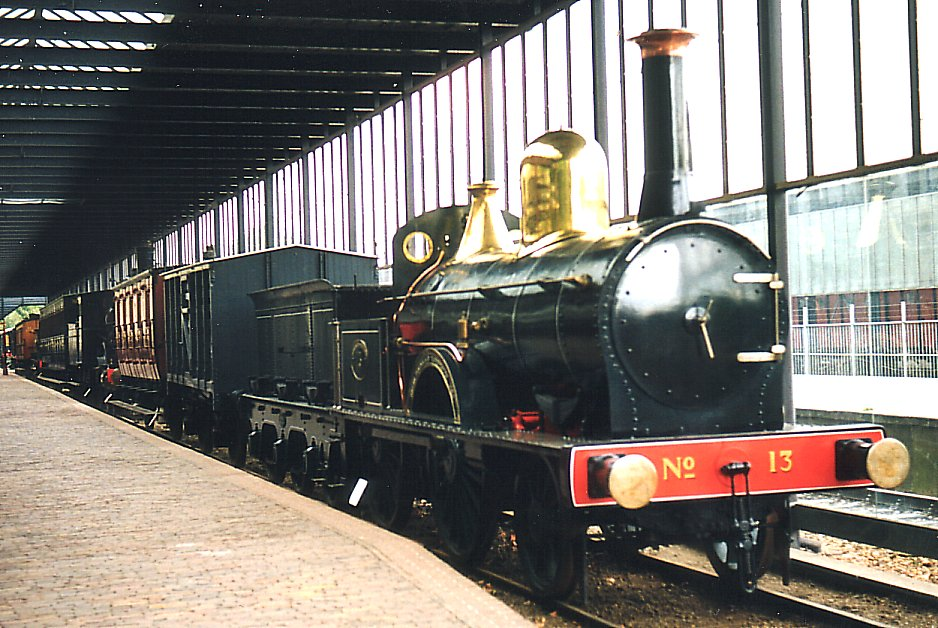
- SS 13 (NS 705) at Spoorwegmuseum
Type and origin
- Power type: Steam
- Builder: Beyer, Peacock & Company
- Build date: 1871, 1865-1873
- Total produced: 86
Specifications
- Configuration
  - Whyte: 2-4-0
  - UIC: 1'B
- Gauge: 1,435 mm (4 ft 8 1/2 in)
- Leading dia.: 1,067 mm (3 ft 6.0 in)
- Driver dia.: 1,700 mm (5 ft 7 in) (SS 17-20: 1,829 mm (6 ft 0 in))
- Tender wheels: 1,067 mm (3 ft 6.0 in)
- Length: 13,637 mm (44 ft 8.9 in) (SS 17-20: 13,552 mm (44 ft 5.5 in))
- Height: 4,013 mm (13 ft 2.0 in)
- Loco weight: 28.8 t (31.7 short tons; 28.3 long tons) (SS 17-20: 26.3 t (29.0 short tons; 25.9 long tons))
- Tender weight: 20.5 t (22.6 short tons; 20.2 long tons) (SS 17-20: 19.9 t (21.9 short tons; 19.6 long tons))
- Fuel type: Coal
- Fuel capacity: 3.5 t (3.9 short tons; 3.4 long tons) (SS 17-20: 3 t (3.3 short tons; 3.0 long tons))
- Water cap.: 6.6 m^{3} (1,500 imp gal) (SS 17-20: 5.8 m^{3} (1,300 imp gal))
- Firebox
  - Grate area: 1.38 m^{2} (14.9 sq ft) (SS 17-20: 1.31 m^{2} (14.1 sq ft))
- Boiler pressure: 8.13 bar (117.9 psi) or 9.80 bar (142.1 psi) (SS 17-20: 6.08 bar (88.2 psi))
- Heating surface
  - Firebox: 7 m^{2} (75 sq ft)
  - Tubes: 73 m^{2} (790 sq ft) or 74 m^{2} (800 sq ft) (SS 17-20: 77 m^{2} (830 sq ft))
- Cylinders: 2
- Cylinder size: 406 mm × 508 mm (16.0 in × 20.0 in)
- Valve gear: Allan
Performance figures
- Maximum speed: 80 km/h (50 mph)
- Tractive effort: 33.83 kN (7,610 lbf) (with higher boiler pressure) (SS 17-20: 19.71 kN (4,430 lbf))
Career
- Operators: NS
- Power class: NS: P^{1}
- Numbers: SS: 1-5, 9-78; MT: MT 2-MT 3 NBDS: 1-5 (6-10); BPM: ? Staatsmijnen: SM 8-SM 9 NS: 701-775
- Withdrawn: 1917-1933
- Disposition: 1 preserved, 85 scrapped

The NS 700 was a series of steam locomotives of Nederlandse Spoorwegen (NS) and its predecessors Maatschappij tot Exploitatie van Staatsspoorwegen (SS) and Noord-Brabantsch-Duitsche Spoorweg-Maatschappij (NBDS).

== Series SS 9-16, 21-78 ==
The SS needed new locomotives for the operation of their new railway lines Arnhem – Deventer, Zutphen – Glanerbrug, Maastricht – Venlo and Almelo – Hengelo in 1865. A large number of SS 5-8 based locomotives were ordered from Beyer, Peacock & Company of Manchester, England, which were delivered between 1865 and 1869 as SS 9-16 and SS 21–78. They skipped numbers SS 17-20 those were taken by the goods engines (later series NS 2900) delivered in 1865.

The boiler and cylinders were similar to the SS 5–8 series. The driving wheels were smaller and the maximum working pressure was increased to 8.3 kg/cm2, increasing the pulling power. The SS 9-16 were delivered with a four-wheeled tender, other locomotives were equipped with a six-wheeled tender. In 1884, a six-wheeled tender from the defunct series SS 5-8 was substituted for the four-wheeled tender of four locomotives from the Nos. SS 9-16 series. Initially, the locomotives were not fitted with a cab. The only protection for the fireman and the driver against bad weather was a plate on top of the firebox. Later, the locomotives were provided with a cab roof. When the fleets of the HSM and the SS was merged into the Dutch Railways in 1921, these locomotives were given the NS numbers 701–766. The series was withdrawn from service between 1930 and 1933.

NS 705 was preserved by Spoorwegmuseum and has been returned to its first built condition of 1864 as SS 13. Originally this locomotive had a four-wheeled tender. The current six wheeled tender comes from SS No. 8. Spoorwegmuseum tried to acquire the original four wheeled tender of NBDS No . 3 in 1947, but without success. SS No. 13 is the oldest surviving Dutch locomotive.

== Series SS 17-20 ==
In 1871, four locomotives with a lower working pressure of 6.2 kg/cm2 (88.18 PSI) were delivered, which were assigned numbers 17-20 after the original series SS 17-20 had been renumbered SS 161–164 in 1871. This subseries is more related to the SS 5–8 series. In contrast to Nos. 5–8, 9-16 and 21–78, these locomotives were fitted with a closed cab. When the fleet of the HSM and the SS was merged in 1921, the locomotives of the SS were given the NS numbers 767-770. The series was withdrawn from service between 1930 and 1933.

== Series SS 1-4 en MT 2-3 ==
In 1872, another order for six locomotives was placed. The first four entered service with the SS Nos. 1-4 taking the numbers of the old SS 1-4, which were renumbered into SS 131–134. However, the other two were delivered to the Société anonyme du Chemin de fer international de Malines à Terneuzen (Mechelen-Terneuzen International Railway, MT) as MT 2 and MT 3, because this company urgently needed locomotives. The MT withdrew these two locomotives from service in 1932. The locomotives of the SS were given the NS numbers 771-774 when the fleets of the HSM and the SS was merged in 1921. The series was withdrawn from service between 1930 and 1933.

== Series NBDS 1-5 (en 6-10) ==
In 1872, the NBDS ordered ten locomotives with four wheeled tenders from Beyer-Peacock of Manchester for the passenger service between Boxtel and Goch. Due to a lack of money, shipment to the Netherlands was postponed and only in 1873 were the first five locomotives put into service as NBDS 1–5. The NBDS 6-10 were canceled, after which the factory could deliver them to the Berlin-Potsdam-Magdeburger Eisenbahn (BPM). The five locomotives were given the names Gijsbert van Beverwijk, Sophia, Mina, Lucinda and Henrietta, named after shareholders of the NBDS. In 1892, the names of the locomotives were removed.

When rail traffic declined sharply during the First World War, the NBDS tried to sell its oldest locomotives. In 1917 Nos. 1 and 3 were sold to the Staatsmijnen, where they were used as SM 8 and SM 9 until 1926 and 1928 respectively for the transport of coal. The Société anonyme du chemin de fer de Gand à Terneuzen (GT) showed interest for Nos. 2, 4 and 5, but canceled a possible purchase due to an asking price that was too high. Nos. 2 and 4 were sold to a contractor in 1918. The remaining five, which had been fitted with a new boiler in 1917, remained in service with the NBDS. After the NBDS had merged into the SS in 1919, this locomotive was incorporated as SS 5 into the SS fleet, and two years later, when the HSM and SS fleets were merged, it was given the NS number 775. The NS withdrew No. 775 in 1931.

== Overview ==
| Factory number | Date built | NBDS number | Name(1873-1892) | SS numbers | NS numbers | Withdrawn | Notes |
|---|---|---|---|---|---|---|---|
| 491-492 | 1865 | | | 9-10 | 701-702 | 1930-1933 | |
| 531-536 | 1865 | | | 11-16 | 703-708 | 1930-1933 | NS 705, returned to its SS condition as SS 13, preserved by the Dutch Railway Museum. |
| 603-615 | 1865 | | | 21-33 | 709-721 | 1930-1933 | |
| 616-617 | 1866 | | | 34-35 | 722-723 | 1930-1933 | |
| 644-655 | 1866 | | | 36-47 | 724-735 | 1930-1933 | |
| 657-687 | 1866 | | | 48-78 | 736-766 | 1930-1933 | |
| 994-995 | 1871 | | | 17-18 | 767-768 | 1930-1933 | |
| 1087-1088 | 1871 | | | 19-20 | 769-770 | 1930-1933 | |
| 1116-1119 | 1872 | | | 1-4 | 771-774 | 1930-1933 | |
| 1120-1121 | 1872 | | | | | 1932 | Initially ordered by the SS, but delivered to the MT as MT 2-MT 3. |
| 1169 | 1873 | 1 | Gijsbert van Beverwijk | | | 1917 | Sold to the Staatsmijnen in 1917, used as SM 8 until 1926. |
| 1170 | 1873 | 2 | Sophia | | | 1918 | Sold to a contractor in 1918. |
| 1171 | 1873 | 3 | Mina | | | 1917 | Sold to the Staatsmijnen in 1917, used as SM 9 until 1928. |
| 1172 | 1873 | 4 | Lucinda | | | 1918 | Sold to a contractor in 1918. |
| 1173 | 1873 | 5 | Henrietta | 5 | 775 | 1931 | |

== Gallery ==
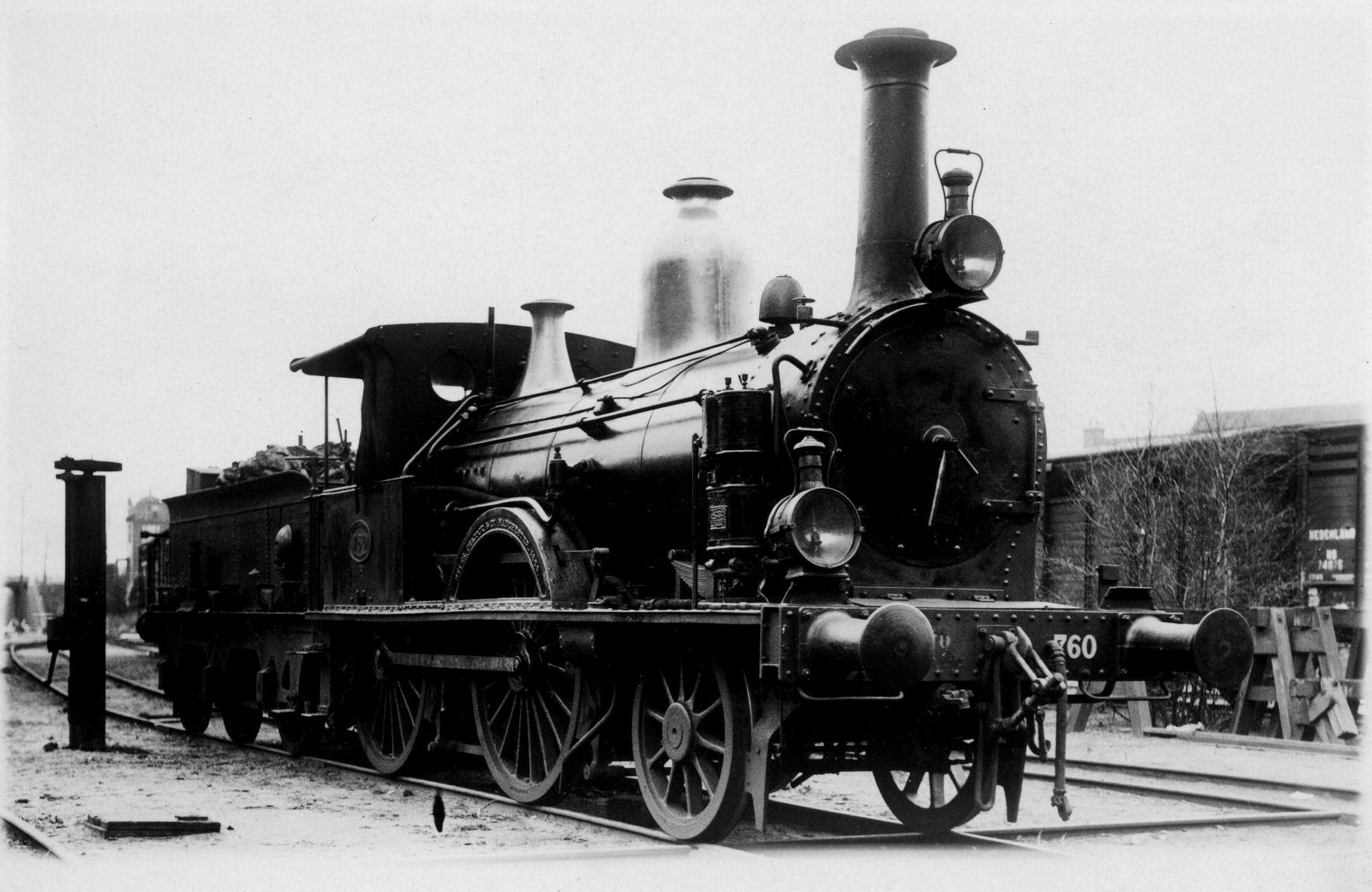
NS 760 (1920 - 1930)

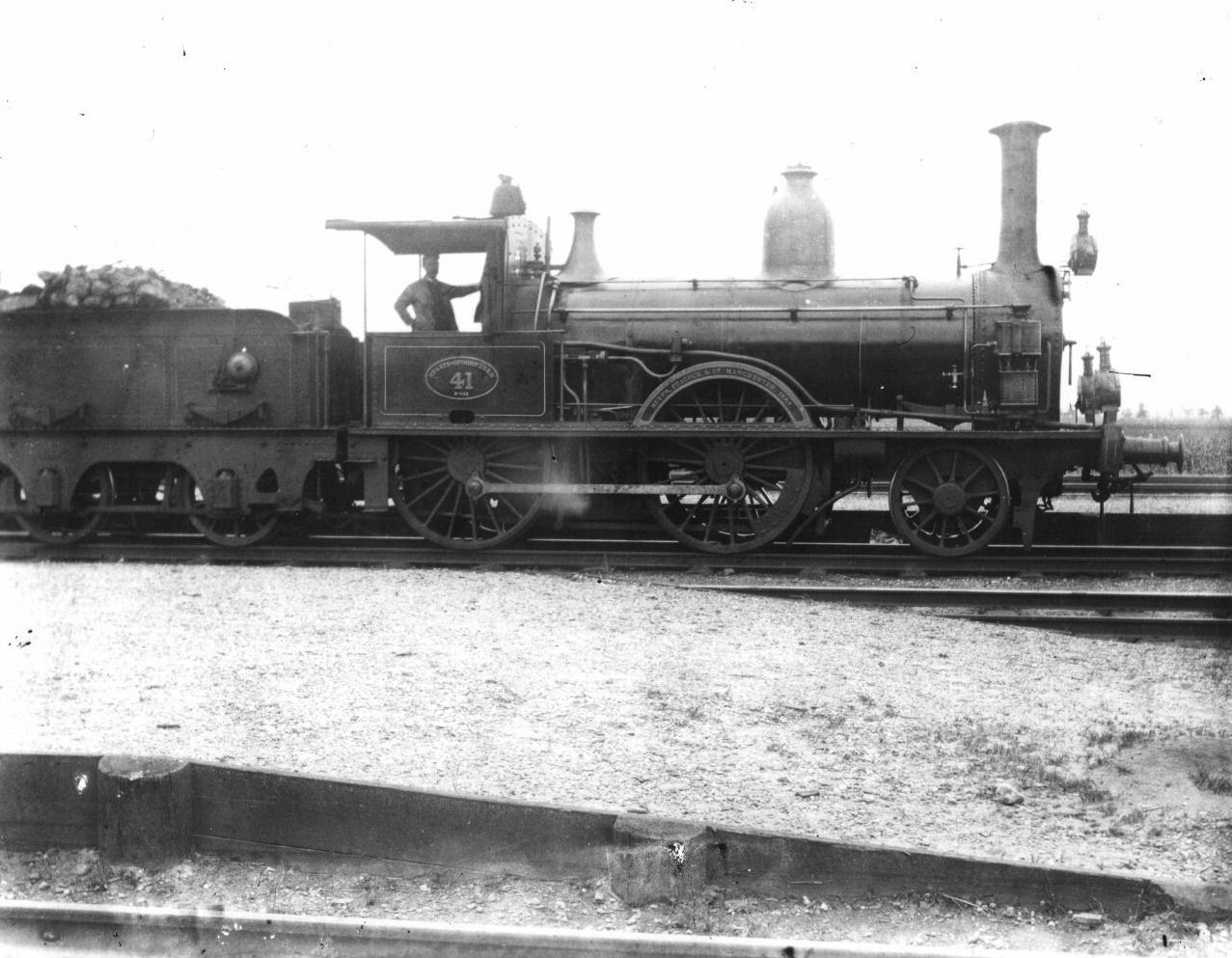
SS No. 41 later NS 729 (1910 - 1920)

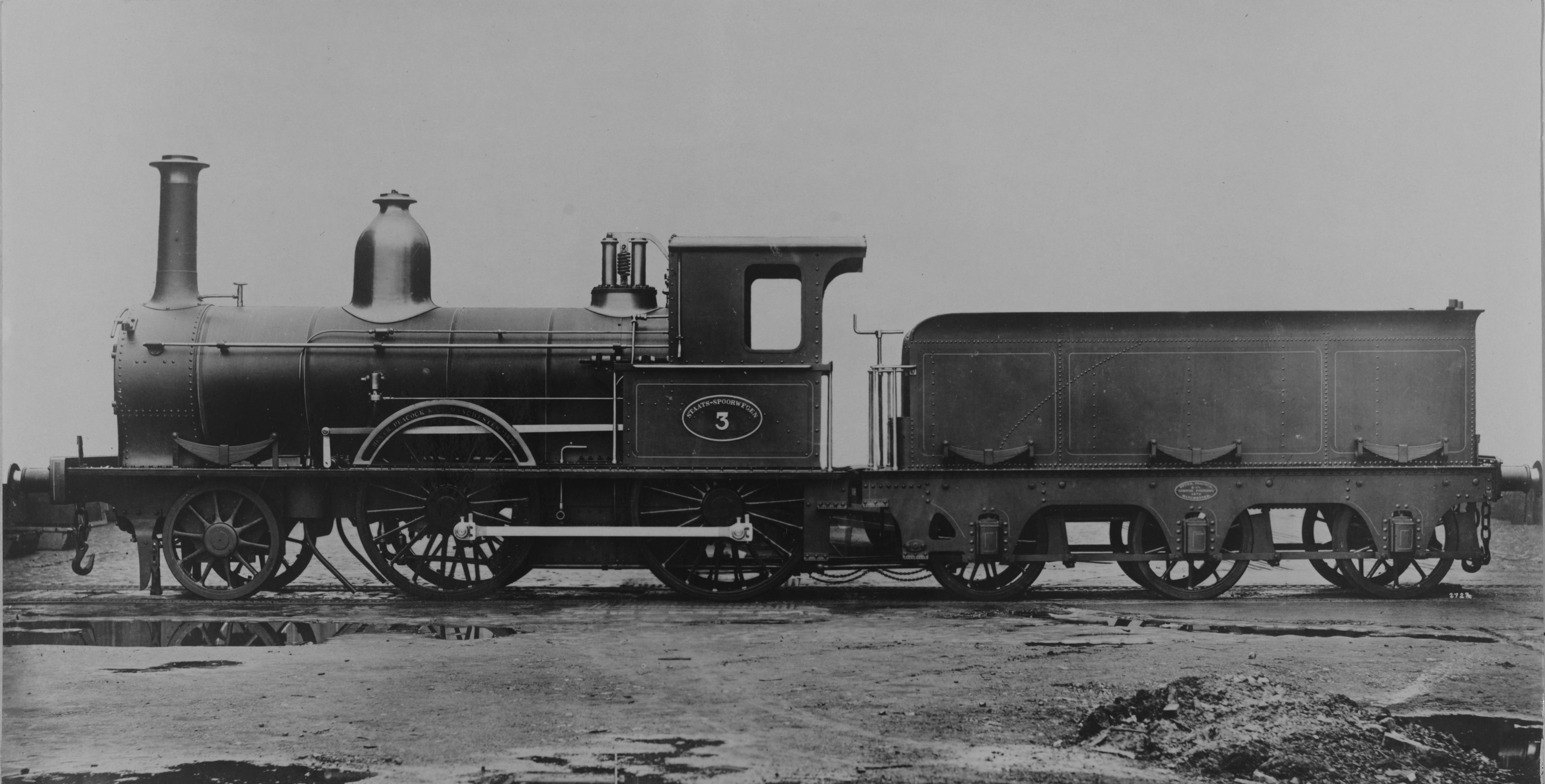
NS 773 (NBDS No. 3). (1872)

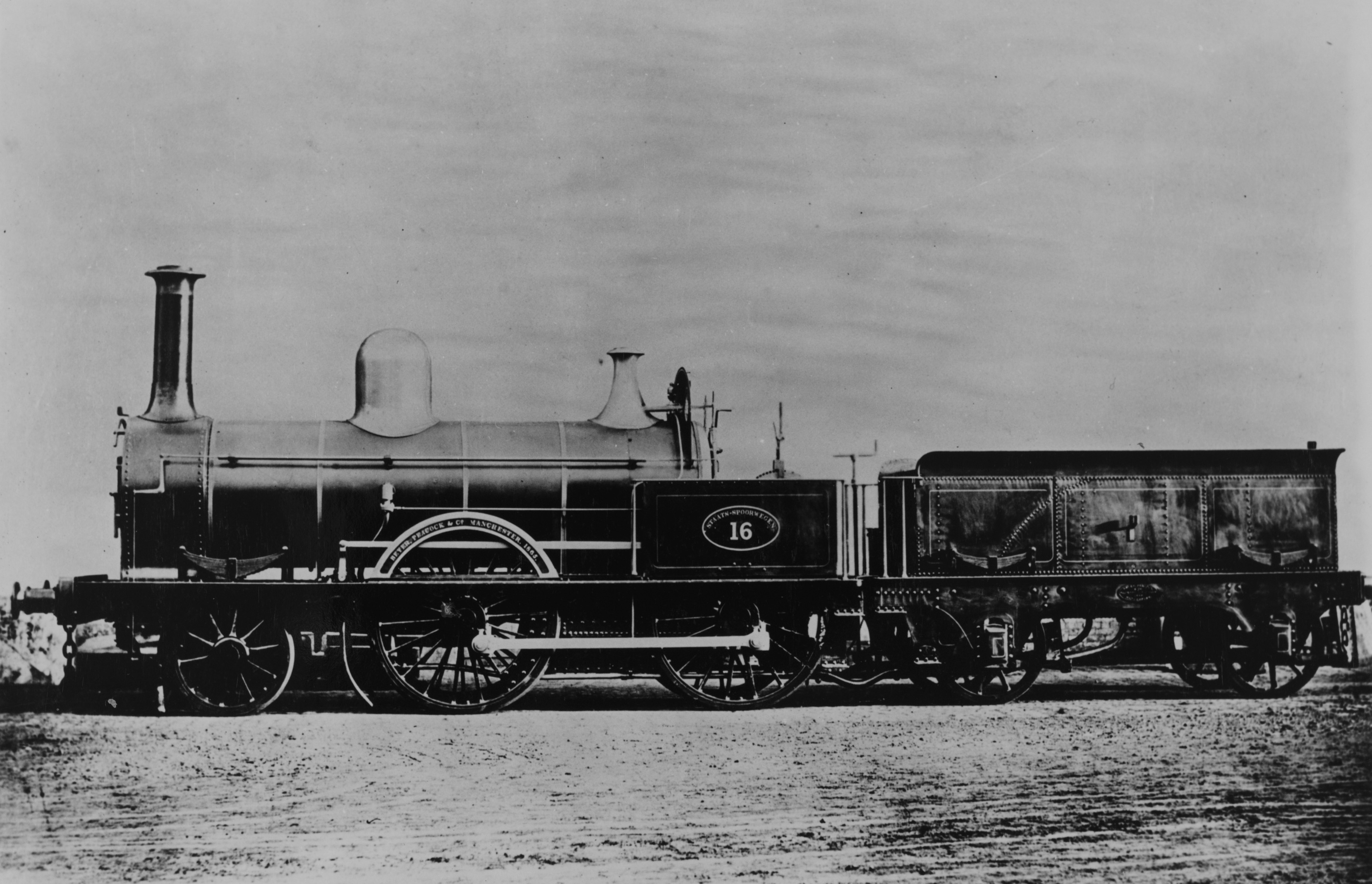
NS 708 / SS 16 (1865)

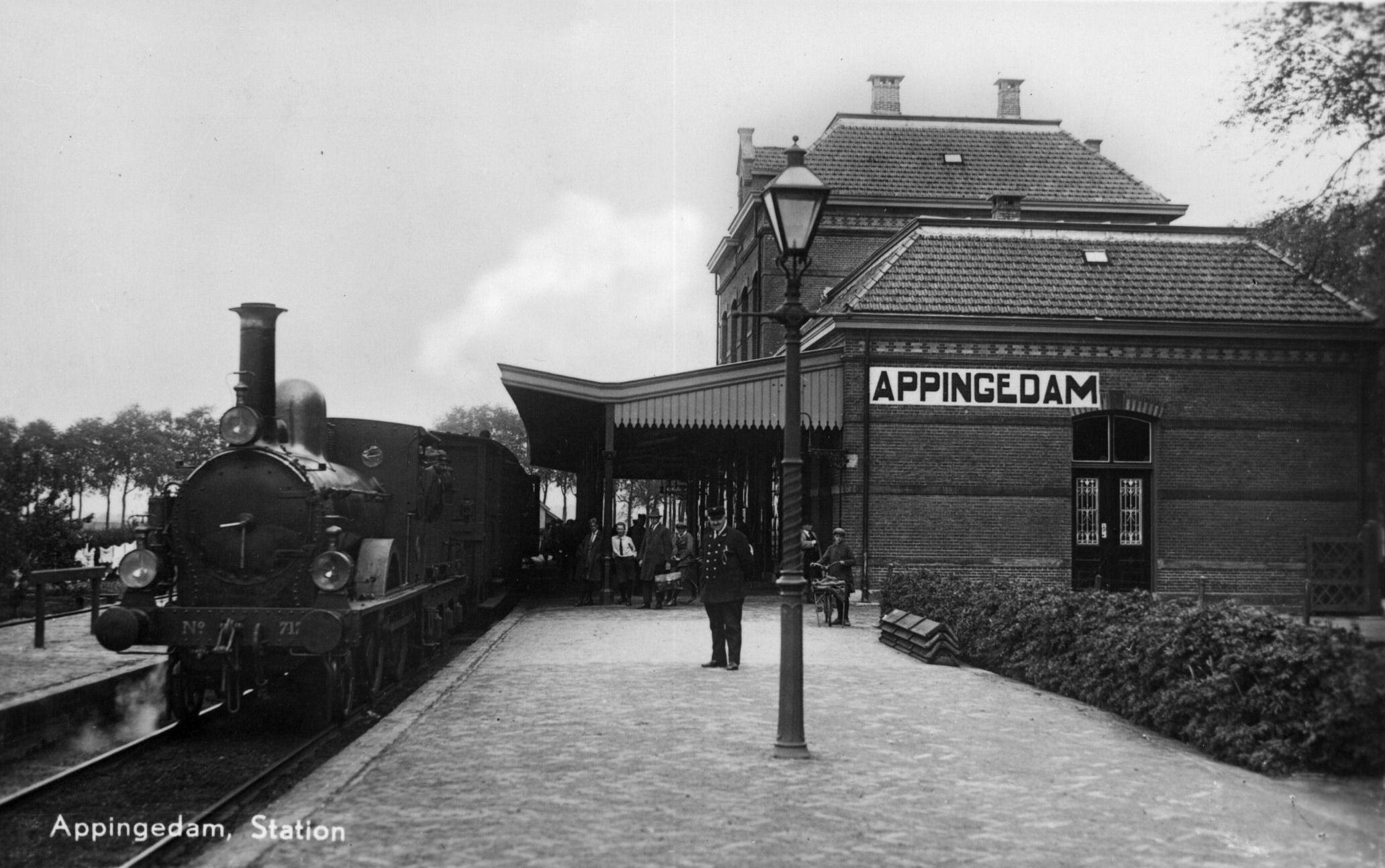
NS 717 with a train along the platform at Appingedam station. (1920 - 1933)

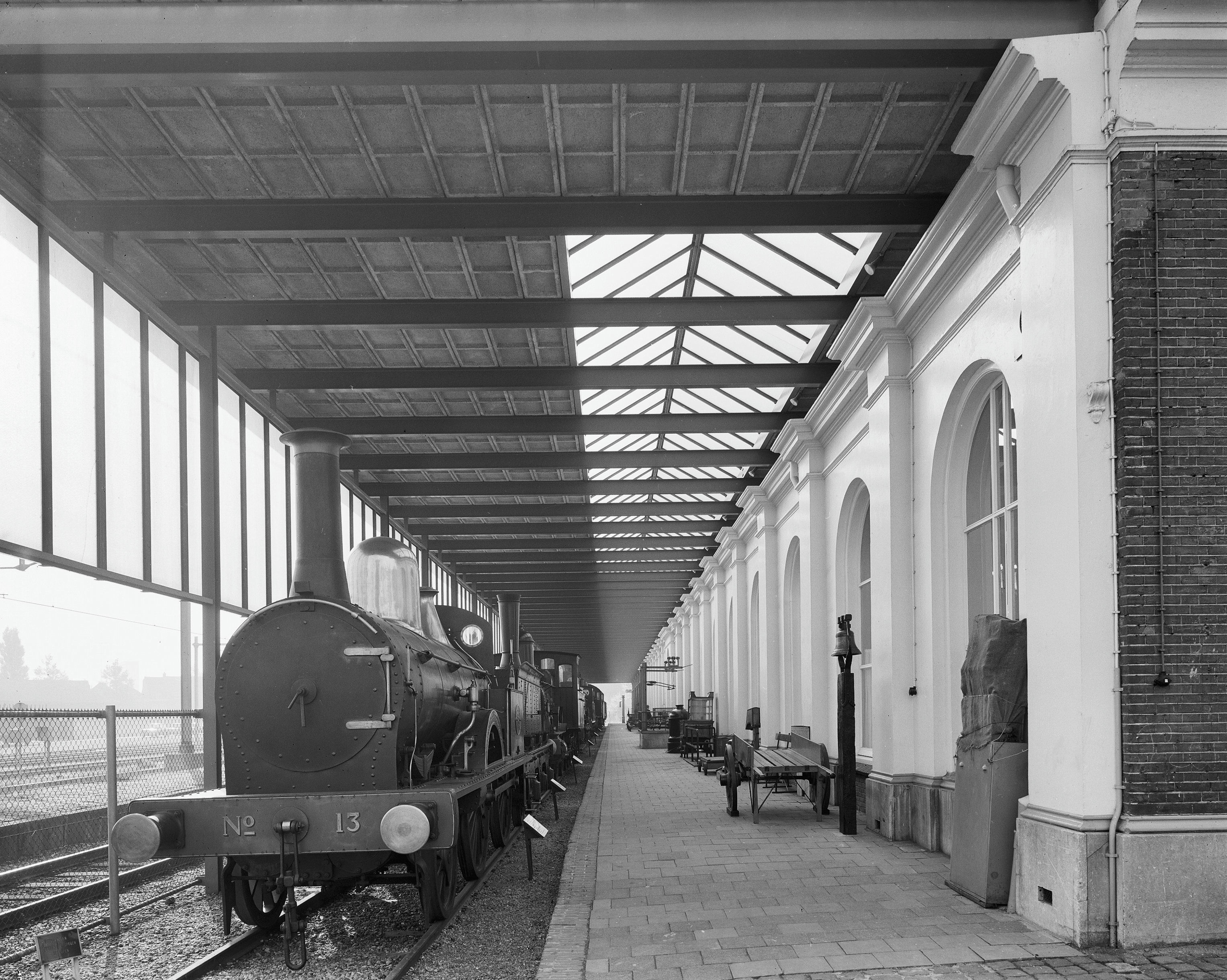
SS 13 (NS 705) at the Dutch Railway Museum in 1973.

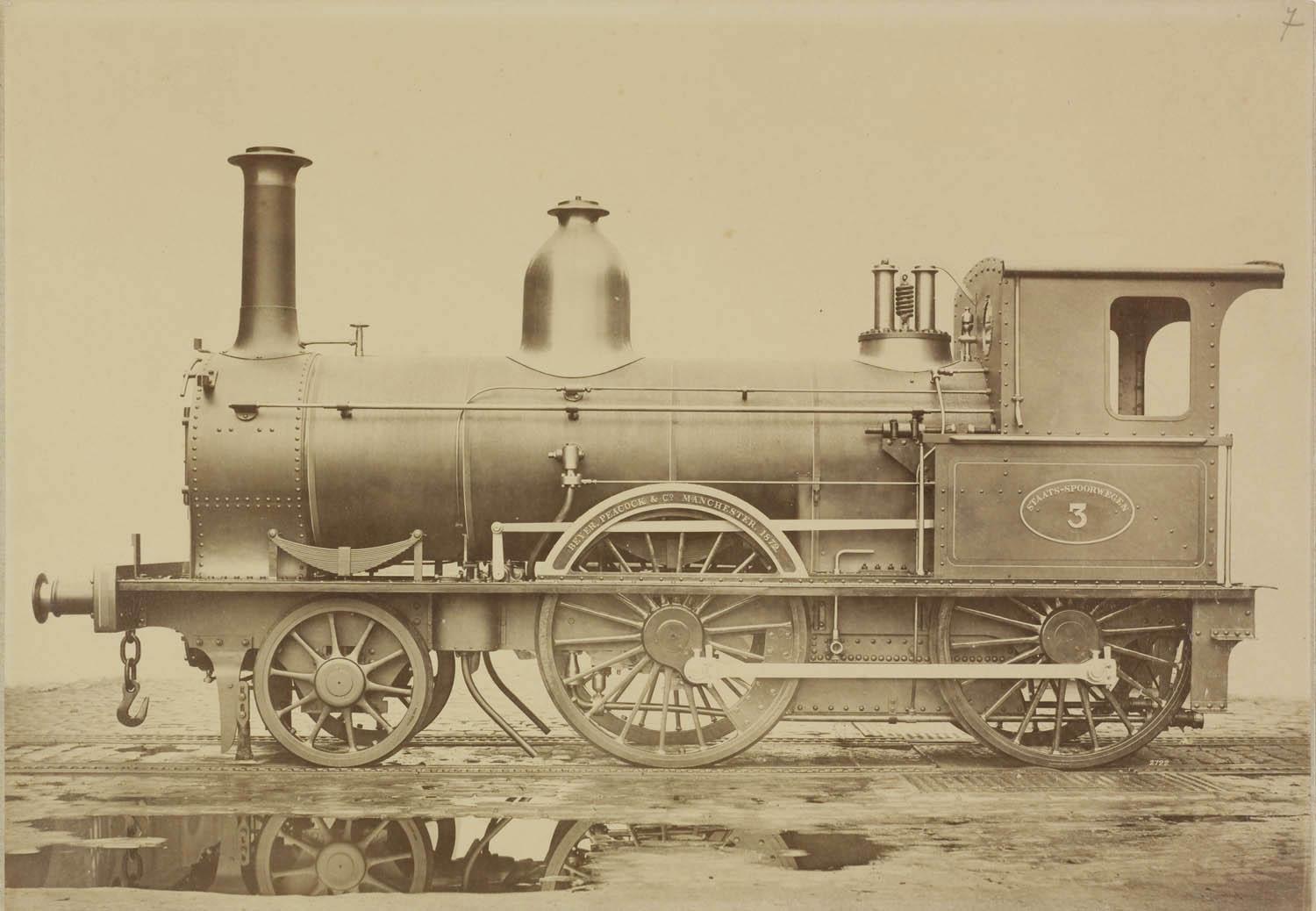
NS 775 (1873)

== Sources and references ==
- H. Waldorp: Mechelen-Terneuzen II, NVBS Op de Rails 1965/6.
- R.C. Statius Muller, A.J. Veenendaal jr., H. Waldorp: De Nederlandse stoomlocomotieven. Uitg. De Alk, Alkmaar, 2005. ISBN 978-90-6013-262-3
- V. Freriks, H. Schlieper: De Noord-Brabantsch-Duitsche Spoorweg-Maatschappij, de Vlissinger Postroute. Uitg. Uquilair, 2008. ISBN 978-90-71513-65-7
