= NS 1300 (steam locomotive) =

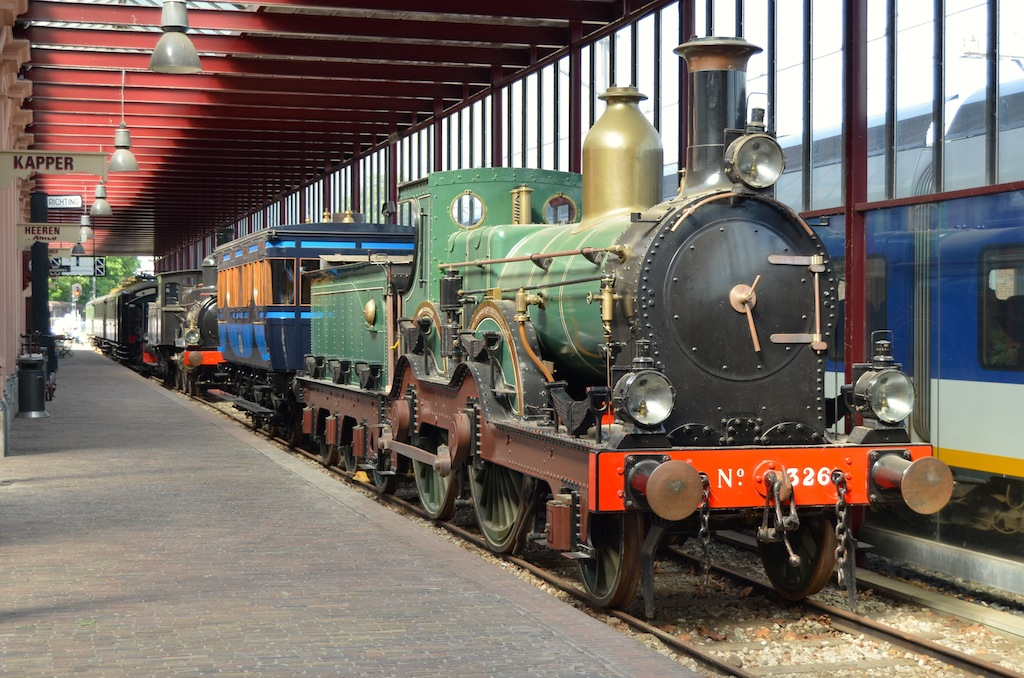
- Locomotive SS 326 (ex-NS 1326) at Spoorwegmuseum
Type and origin
- Power type: Steam
- Builder: Beyer, Peacock & Company
- Build date: 1880 - 1895
- Total produced: 179
Specifications
- Configuration
  - Whyte: 2-4-0
  - UIC: 1'B
- Gauge: 1,435 mm (4 ft 8 1/2 in)
- Leading dia.: 1,219 mm (4 ft 0 in), 1,240 mm (4 ft 1 in)
- Driver dia.: 2,134 mm (7 ft 0 in), 2,150 mm (7 ft 1 in)
- Tender wheels: 1,219 mm (4 ft 0 in), 1,240 mm (4 ft 1 in)
- Length: 15,395 mm (50 ft 6.1 in), 15,427 mm (50 ft 7.4 in) (1399 - 1478), 15,454 mm (50 ft 8.4 in)
- Height: 4,115 mm (13 ft 6.0 in), 4,123 mm (13 ft 6.3 in)
- Loco weight: 42 t (46 short tons; 41 long tons)
- Tender weight: 22 t (24 short tons; 22 long tons)
- Fuel type: Coal
- Water cap.: 10.3 m^{3} (2,300 imp gal), later: 13 m^{3} (2,900 imp gal)
- Tender cap.: 4 t (4.4 short tons; 3.9 long tons)
- Firebox
  - Grate area: 2.10 m^{2} (22.6 sq ft)
- Boiler pressure: 10.3 bar (149 psi)
- Heating surface
  - Firebox: 10 m^{2} (110 sq ft)
  - Tubes: 93 m^{2} (1,000 sq ft)
- Cylinders: 2
- Cylinder size: 457 mm × 660 mm (18.0 in × 26.0 in)
- Valve gear: Stephenson
Performance figures
- Maximum speed: 90 km/h (56 mph)
Career
- Operators: Nederlandse Spoorwegen
- Power class: NS: P3
- Nicknames: Grote Groenen, Armen en Benen
- Withdrawn: 1925 - 1940
- Preserved: 1, all the others scrapped

The NS 1300 was a series of steam locomotives of Nederlandse Spoorwegen and its predecessors Maatschappij tot Exploitatie van Staatsspoorwegen (SS) and Noord-Brabantsch-Duitsche Spoorweg-Maatschappij (NBDS).

== SS 301-475 ==
This series followed the 101–105 series. After the introduction of the Westinghouse brake, a system whereby the driver could brake all wagons simultaneously, the speed on the railway network could be increased and the SS decided not to expand the series 101–105, but to purchase new, stronger locomotives.

Between 1880 and 1895, 175 locomotives were built by the Beyer, Peacock & Company of Manchester, England. Because these were the largest 1B locomotives in Europe at the time of purchase and with the light green colour scheme of the SS, these locomotives were nicknamed Grote Groenen (Big Greens).

The tenders of the 301-398 had a water capacity of 10.3 m^{3}. From No. 399 onwards, the water capacity of the tenders was increased to 13 m^{3} by lowering the tank between the frames. Later on, the water capacity of the tenders was also increased in the same way for the 301–398.

When the fleet of the HSM and the SS was merged into the Dutch Railways in 1921, these locomotives were given the NS numbers 1301–1475, with the NS numbers of 1462–1466 in deviation from the SS numbers 463-466 and 462.

The series was withdrawn from service between 1925 and 1940, with the most going in 1935.

The NS 1326, withdrawn in 1939, was kept for the Spoorwegmuseum and has been returned to its Staatsspoorwegen condition as SS 326.

== NBDS No. 6, 7, 11 ==
The mail trains, which had been led via Venlo since 1888, returned in December 1892 to the Boxtel - Wesel, the "German Line". For this, the NBDS ordered three 1'B express locomotives from Beyer, Peacock & Company of Manchester. Unlike No. 8-10, these locomotives were completely similar to the Grote Groenen 301-375 of the SS. In order to be able to deliver of a new locomotive on time despite the delivery deadline, they took the already under construction SS 462 and completed the locomotive for the NBDS and entered service as NBDS 7 in November 1892. A new locomotive, SS 462 was built for the SS.

After the NBDS merged into the SS in 1919, these locomotives were included as SS 476–478 in the fleet of the SS, and two years later, when the fleet of the HSM and the SS was merged into Nederlandse Spoorwegen, they received the NS numbers 1476- 1478. In 1933 No. 1477 was withdrawn. No. 1476 and 1478 followed in 1936.

== SS 701 ==
In 1892, Beyer-Peacock built a compound locomotive which was given the number 701 by the SS. With the series 701-706 entering service in 1910, this locomotive was renumbered to No. 479 in 1909. In 1921, this locomotive was given the NS number 1479.

Because the compound system with this locomotive did not yield any savings, the NS rebuild the locomotive in 1924 into a single expansion. In 1936, the locomotive was withdrawn.

== Overview ==
Factory numbers	Date built	NBDS number	SS numbers	NS numbers	Withdrawn	Notes
1923-1929	1880		301-307	1301-1307	1925-1937	
1971-1975	1880		308-312	1308-1312	1925-1936	
2031-2035	1880		313-317	1313-1317	1926-1937	
2093-2102	1881		318-327	1318-1327	1925-1939	NS 1326, restored to the condition of the SS 326, preserved by the Dutch Railway Museum.
2118-2122	1882		328-332	1328-1332	1931-1935	
2143-2147	1882		333-337	1333-1337	1931-1939	
2251-2260	1882		338-347	1338-1347	1925-1939	
2354-2371	1883		348-365	1348-1365	1926-1937	
2468-2477	1884		366-375	1366-1375	1926-1935	
2521-2527	1885		376-382	1376-1382	1924-1940	
2669-2673	1885		383-387	1383-1387	1932-1935	
2701-2710	1886		388-397	1388-1397	1929-1935	
2822	1888		398	1398	1935	
3047-3056	1889		399-408	1399-1408	1926-1935	
3087-3088	1889		409-410	1409-1410	1932-1933	
3366-3385	1891		411-430	1411-1430	1929-1937	
3394	1892		701, since 1909: 479	1479	1936	Originally a compound locomotive, after rebuilding equal to the rest.
3450-3454	1891		431-435	1431-1435	1932-1940	
3471-3495	1892		436-460	1436-1460	1930-1939	
3522	1892		461	1461	1937	
3523	1892	7	477	1477	1933	Construction started as SS 462 but delivered as NBDS 7.
3524-3526	1892		463-465	1462-1464	1931-1939	
3546	1893		462	1465	1937	Replacement SS 462, after the original was delivered as NBDS 7.
3539	1893	6	476	1476	1936	
3614	1894	11	478	1478	1936	
3683-3692	1895		466-475	1466-1475	1934-1939	

== Gallery ==
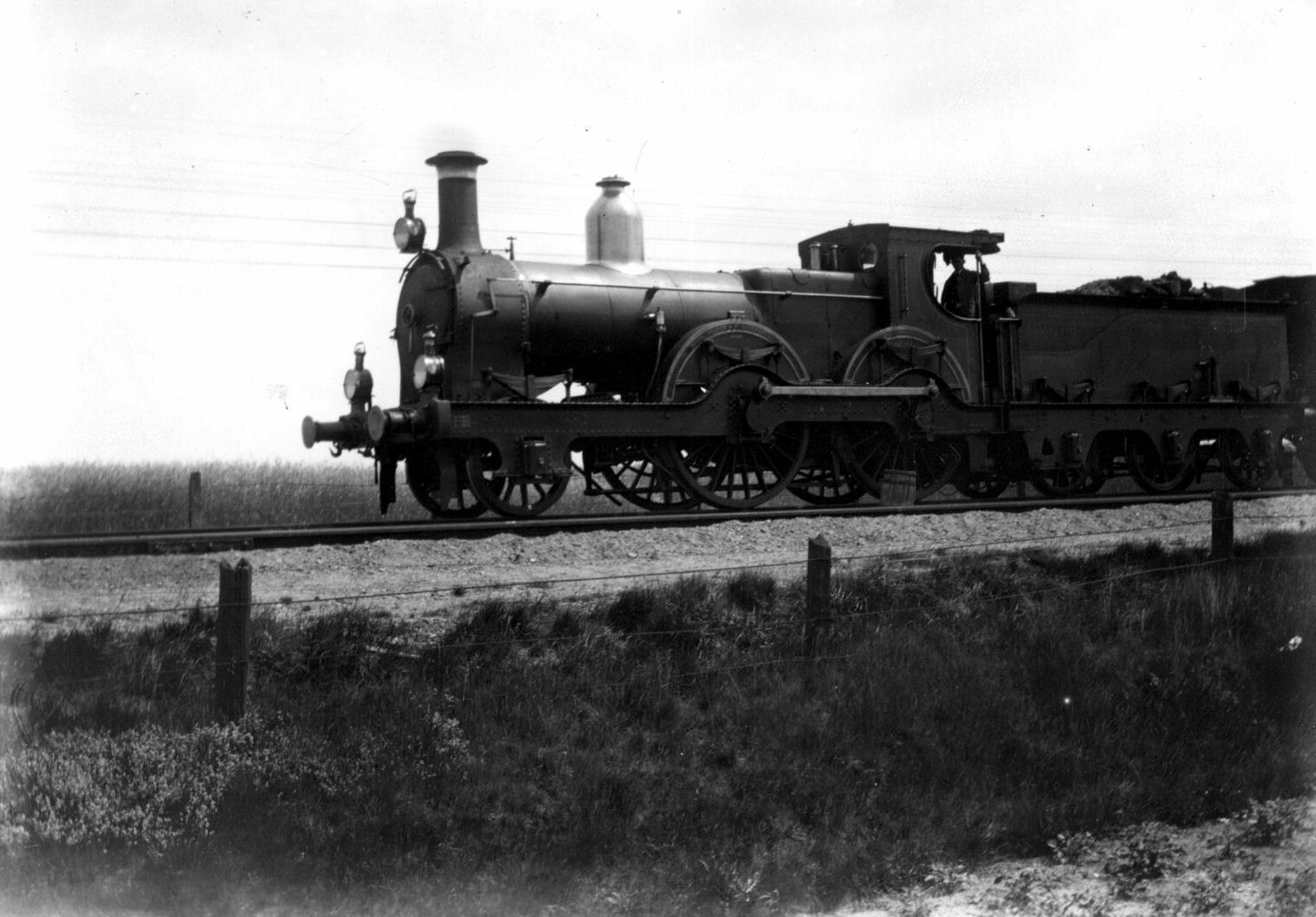
A locomotive from the series NS 1300/1400. (1910 - 1920)

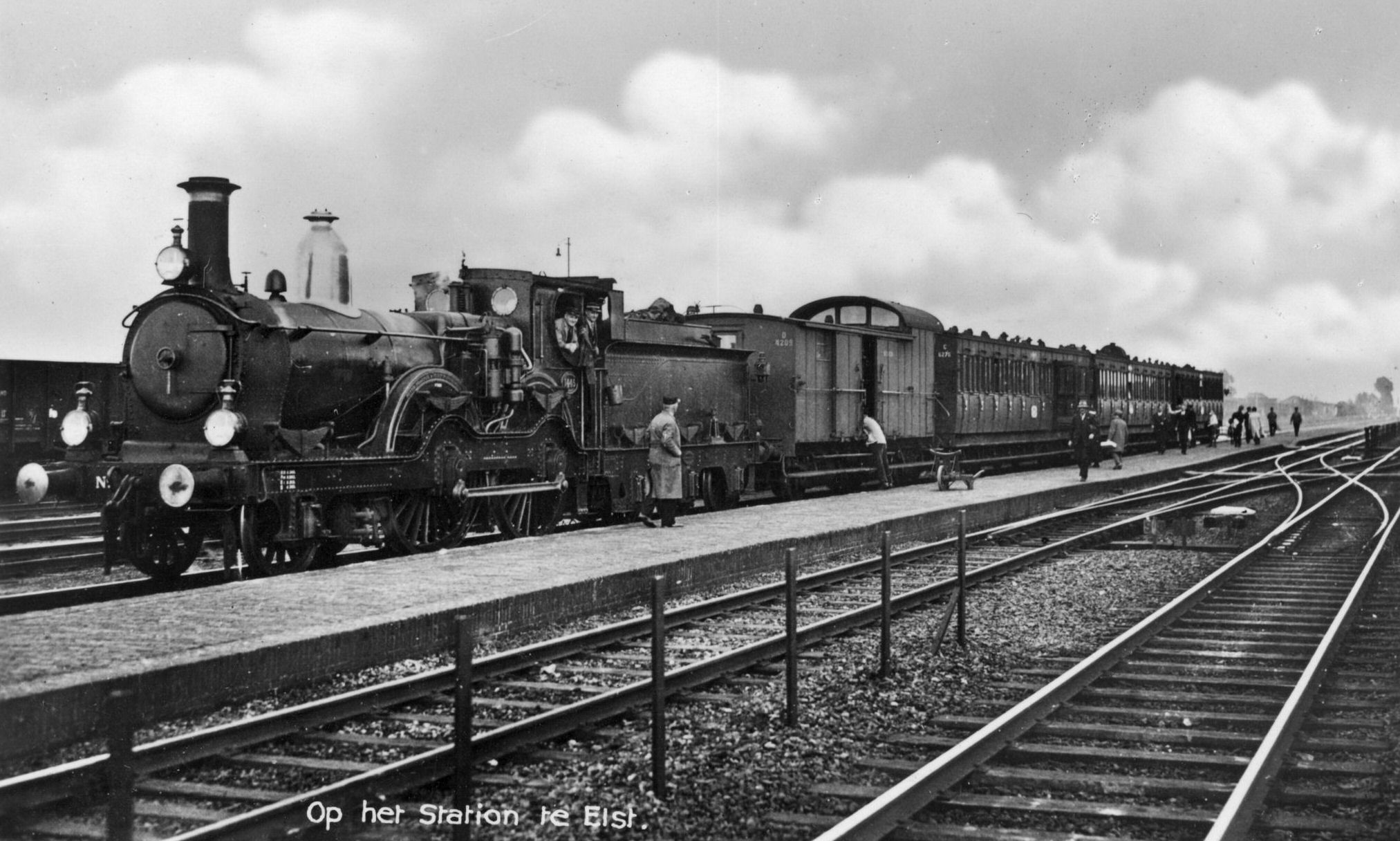
NS 1445 with a train along the platform of Elst. (1935 - 1940)

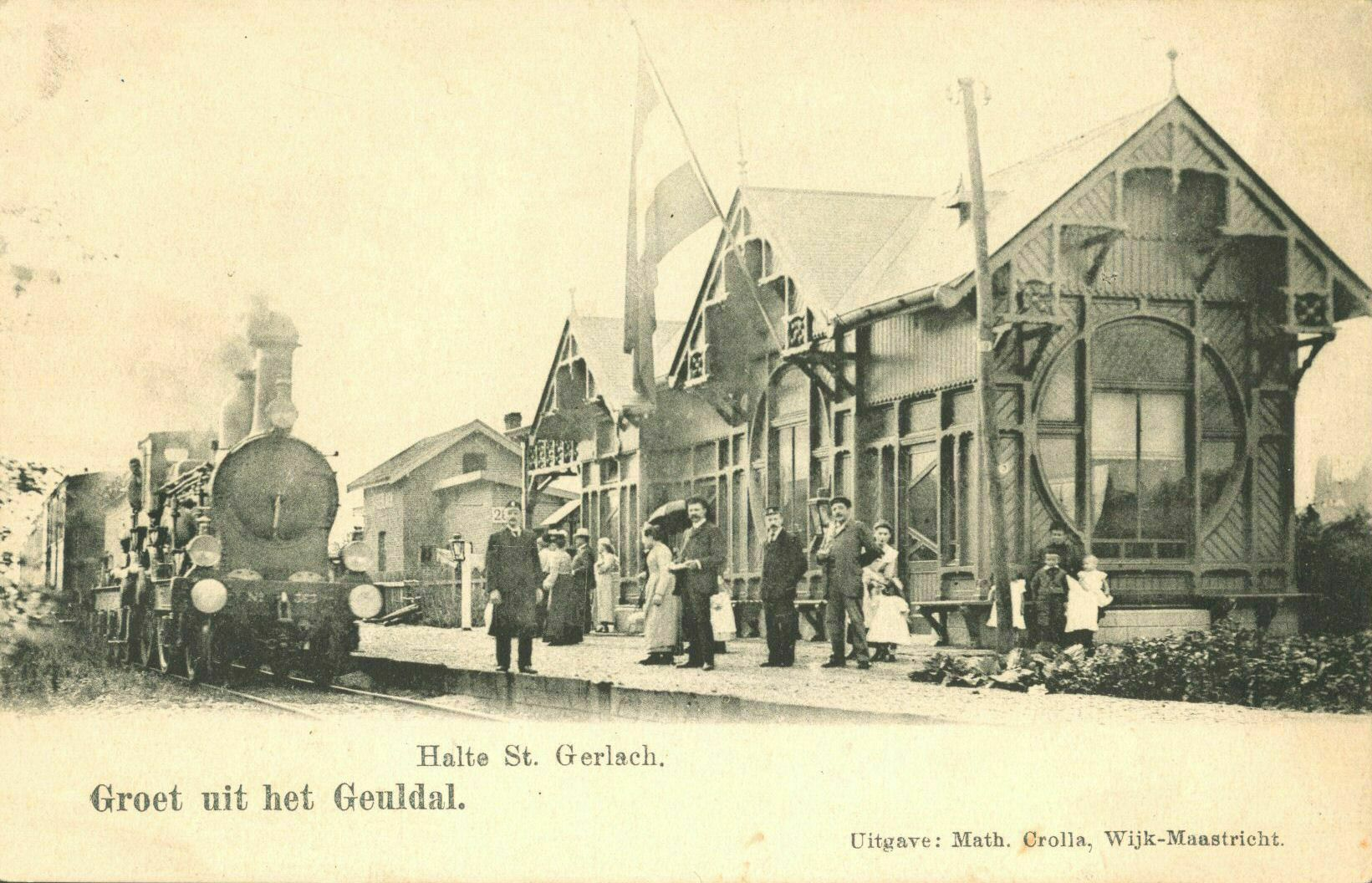
NS 1363 (SS 363) at St. Gerlach station. (1903)

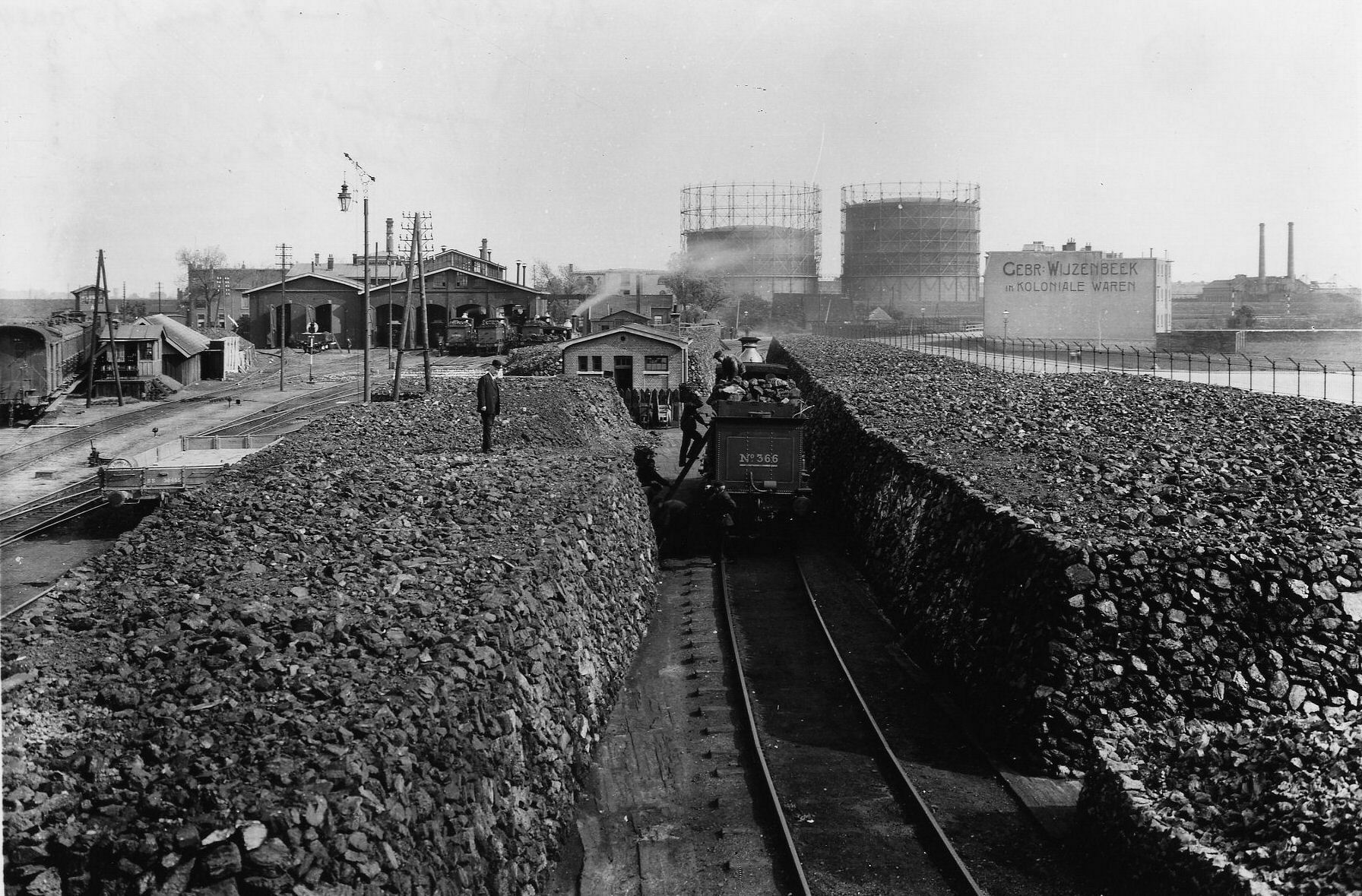
NS 1366 between the coalpiles at the coal depot in The Hague. (1913)

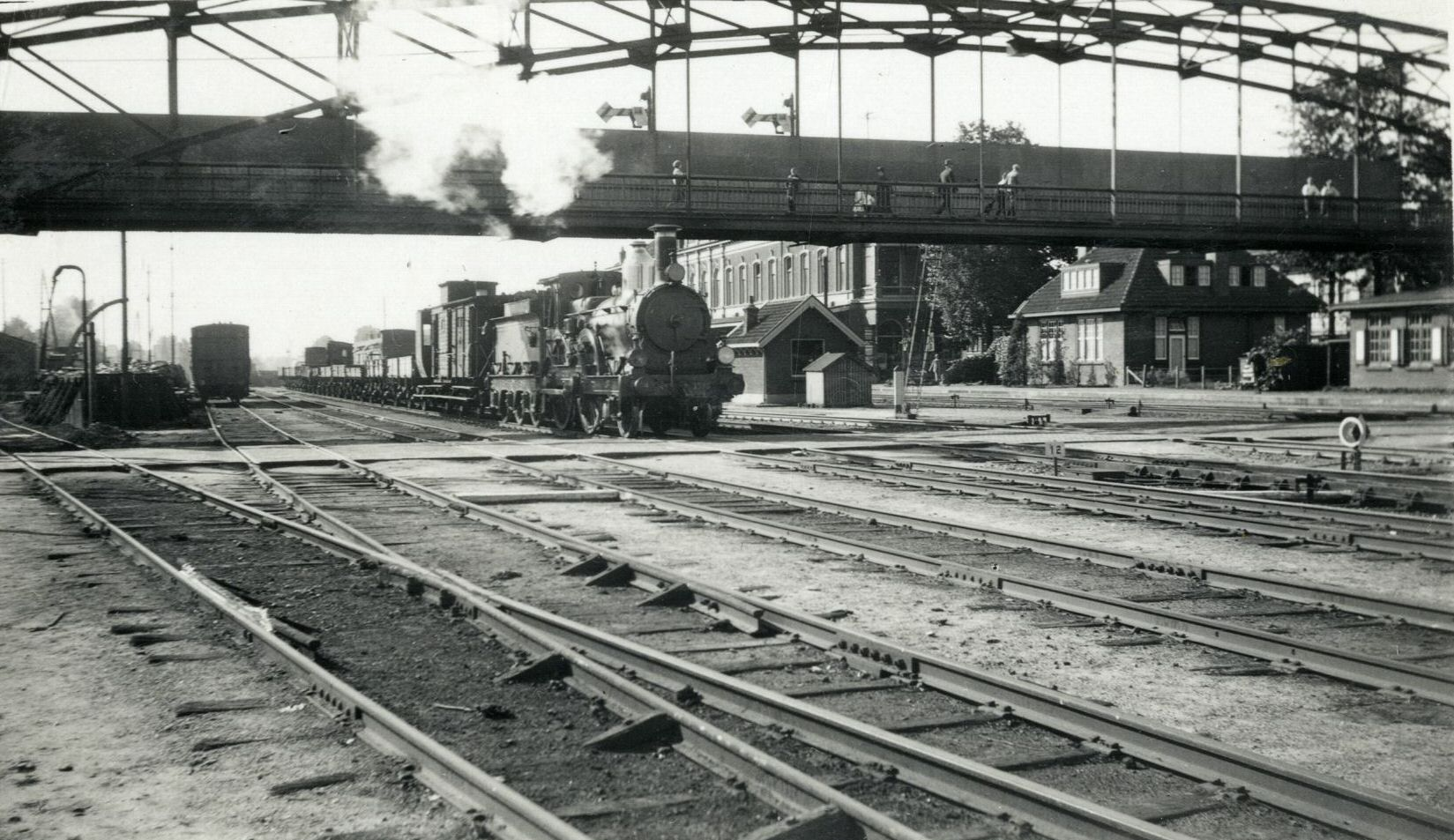
NS 1389 with a sand train near Hilversum. (1930 - 1940)

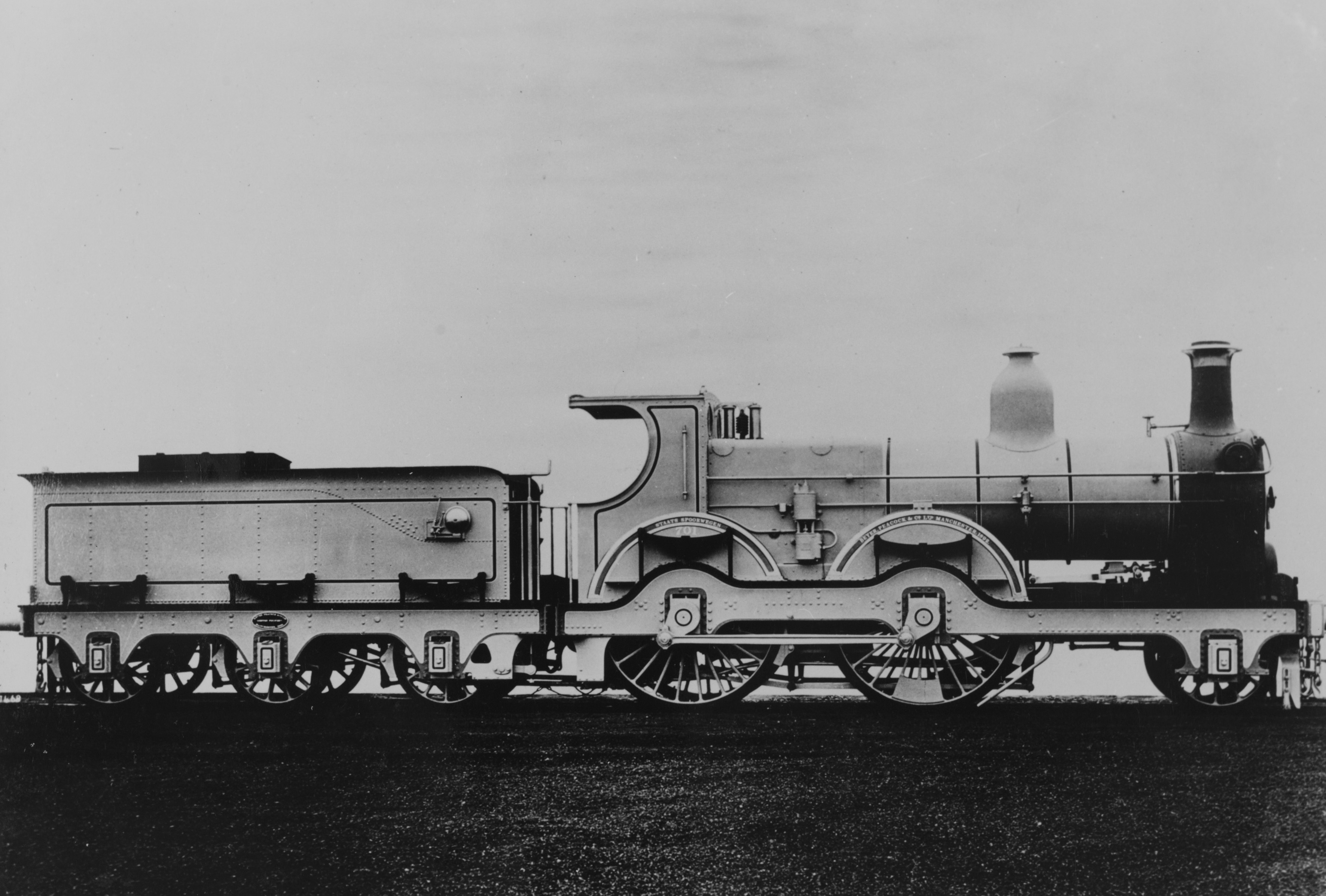
NS 1479 compound locomotive (1892)

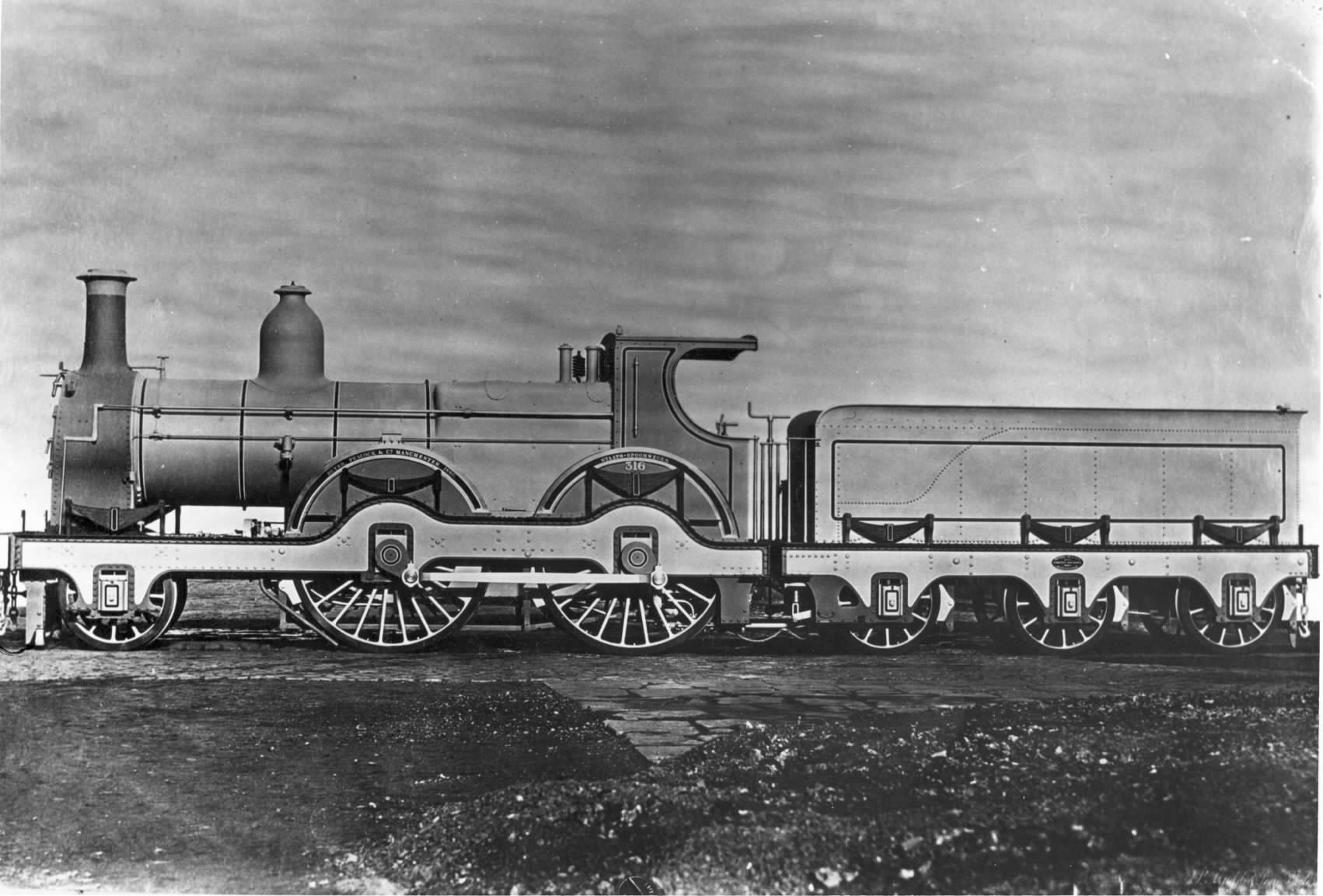
NS 1316 presumably factory new (1880)

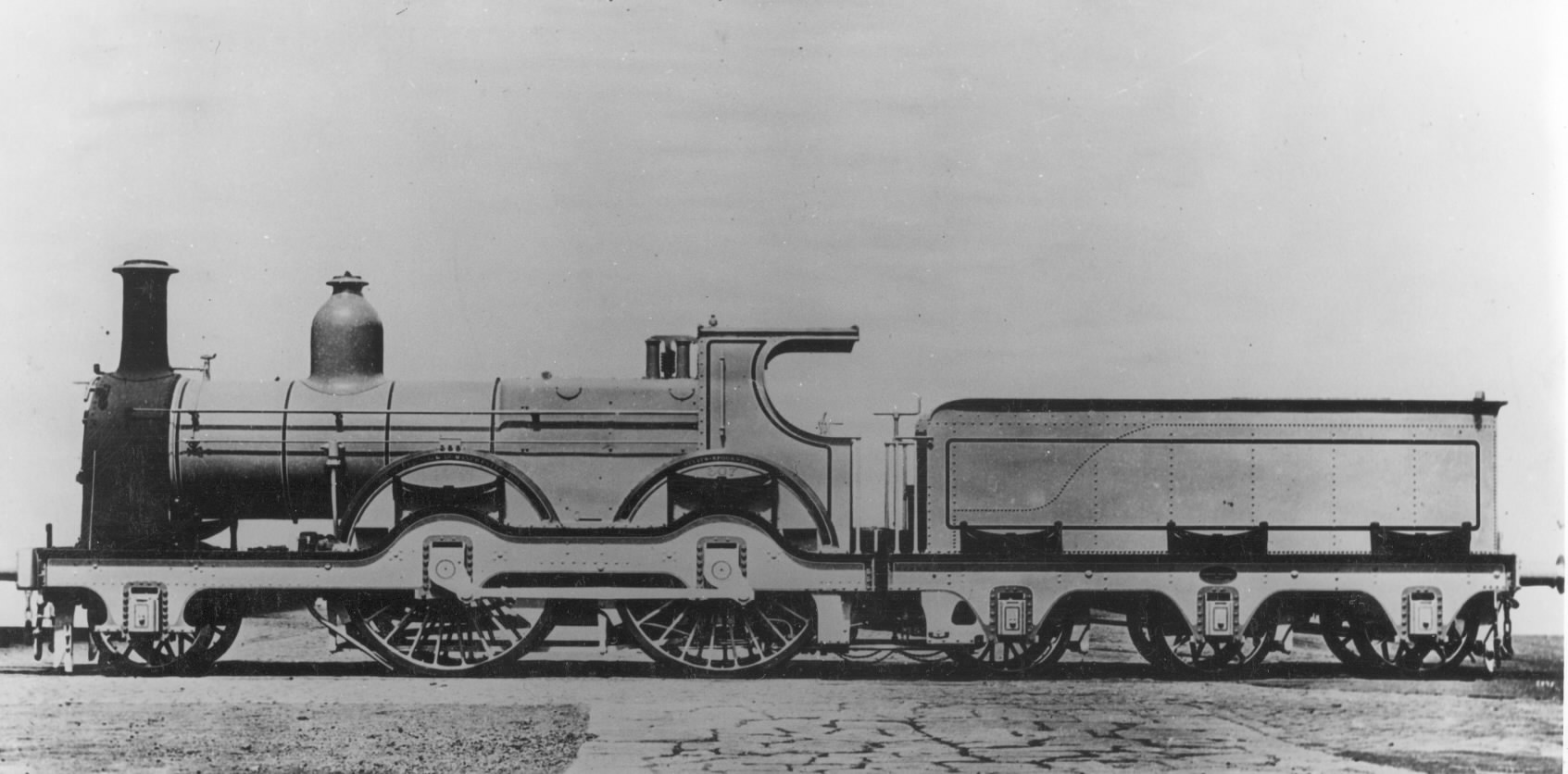
NS 1307 presumably factory new (1880)

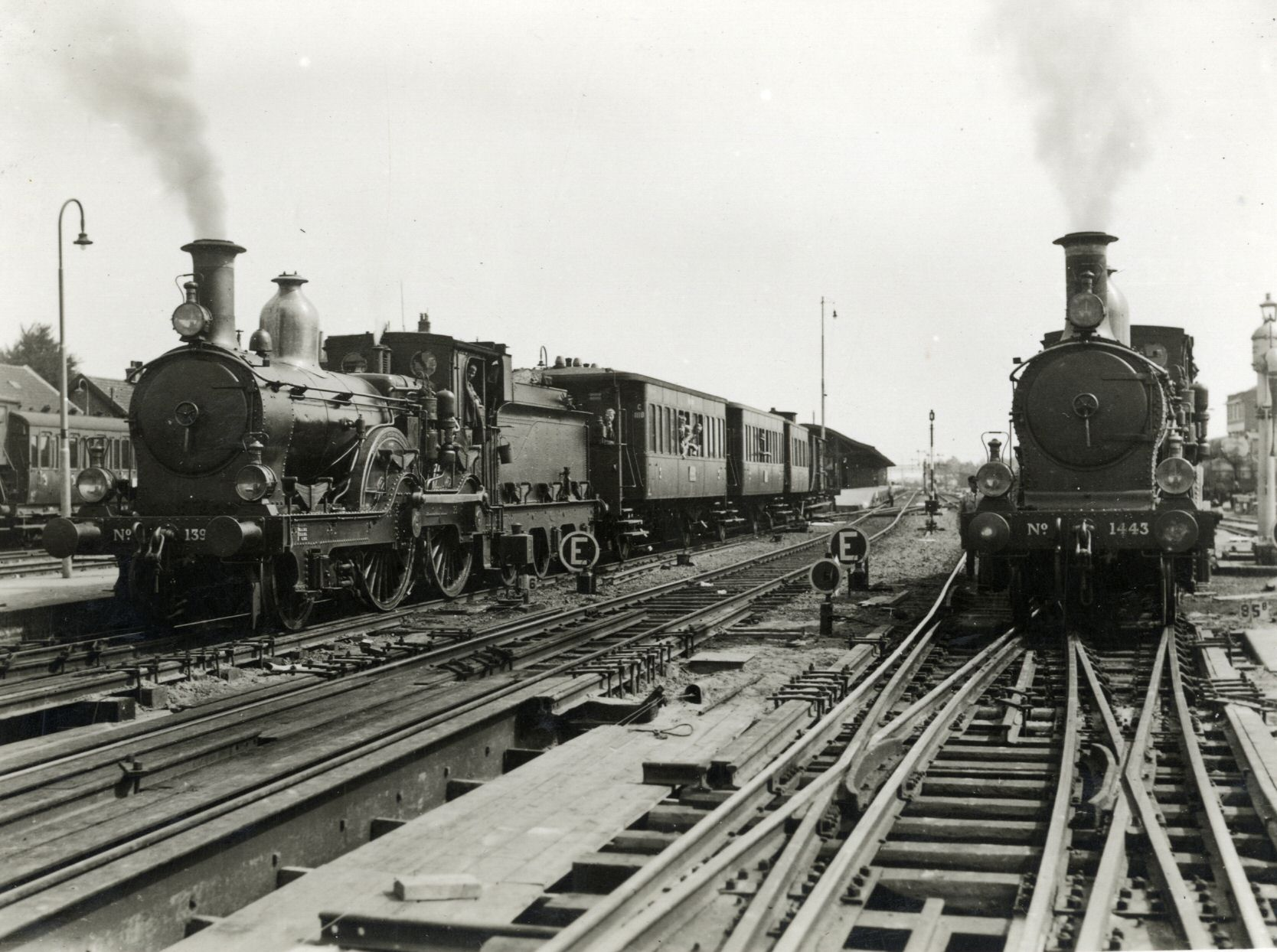
NS 139X (left) and NS 1443 (right). (1930 - 1940)

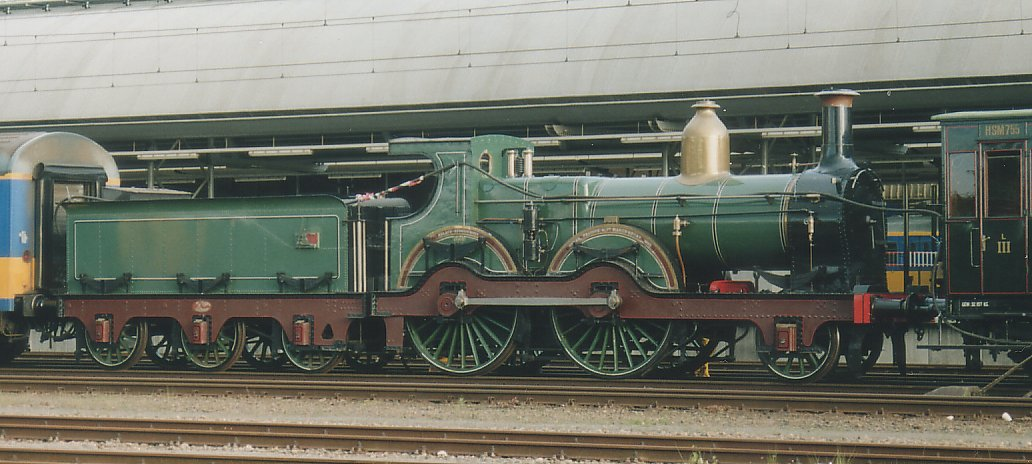
SS 326 of Het Spoorwegmuseum, on transport from Amersfoort back to the newly renovated museum.

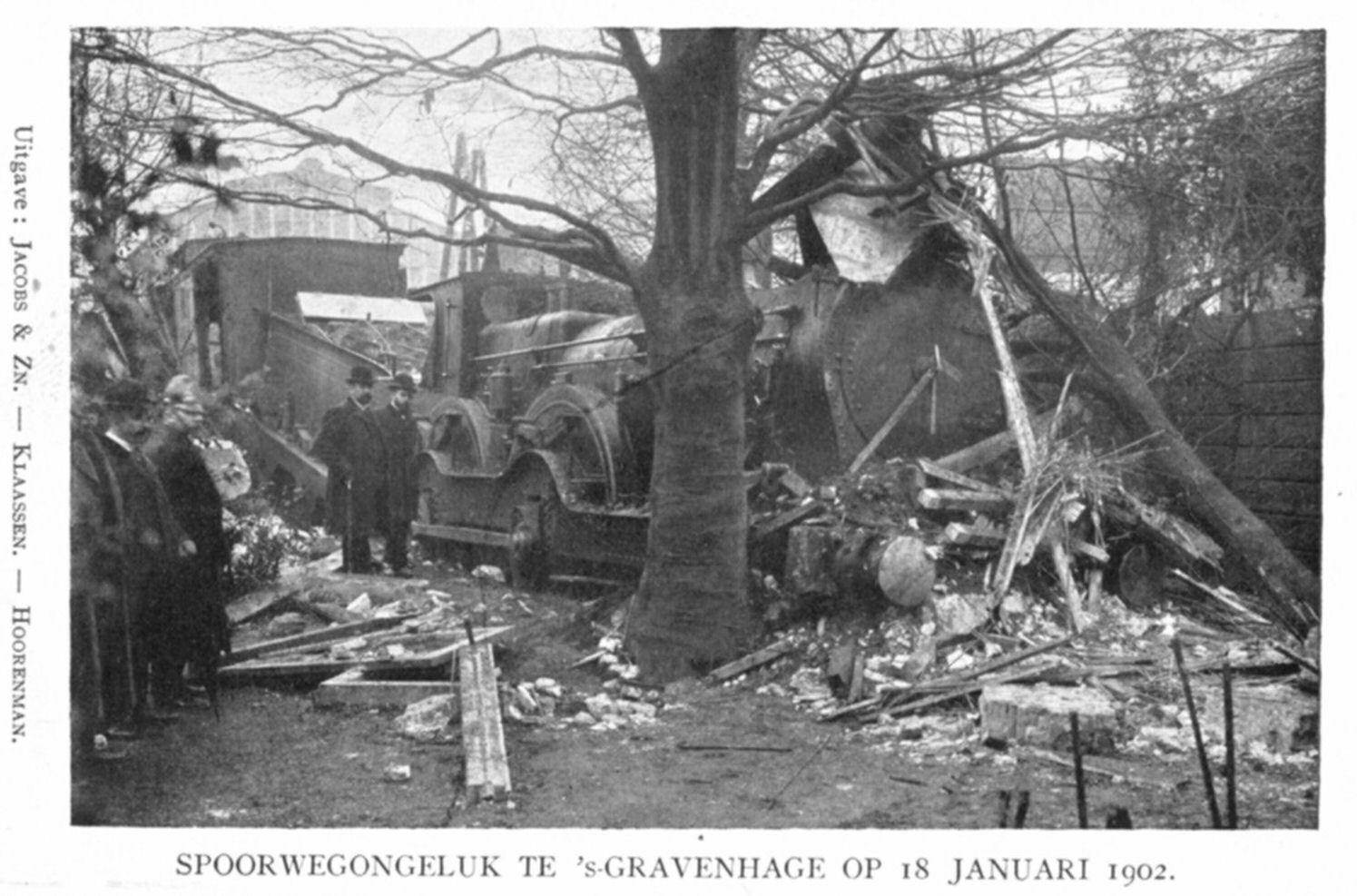
A series 1300/1400 locomotive in the garden of the Hotel De Hertenkamp in The Hague, after having been driven through a set buffer at the station The Hague S.S. (18-01-1902)

== Sources and references ==
- R.C. Statius Muller, A.J. Veenendaal jr., H. Waldorp: De Nederlandse stoomlocomotieven. Uitg. De Alk, Alkmaar, 2005. ISBN 90-6013-262-9.
- V. Freriks, Schlieper: De Noord-Brabantsch-Duitsche Spoorweg-Maatschappij, de Vlissinger Postroute. Uitg. Uquilair, 2008. ISBN 978-90-71513-65-7.
