= NS 3500 =

Class of 8 Dutch 4-6-0 locomotives

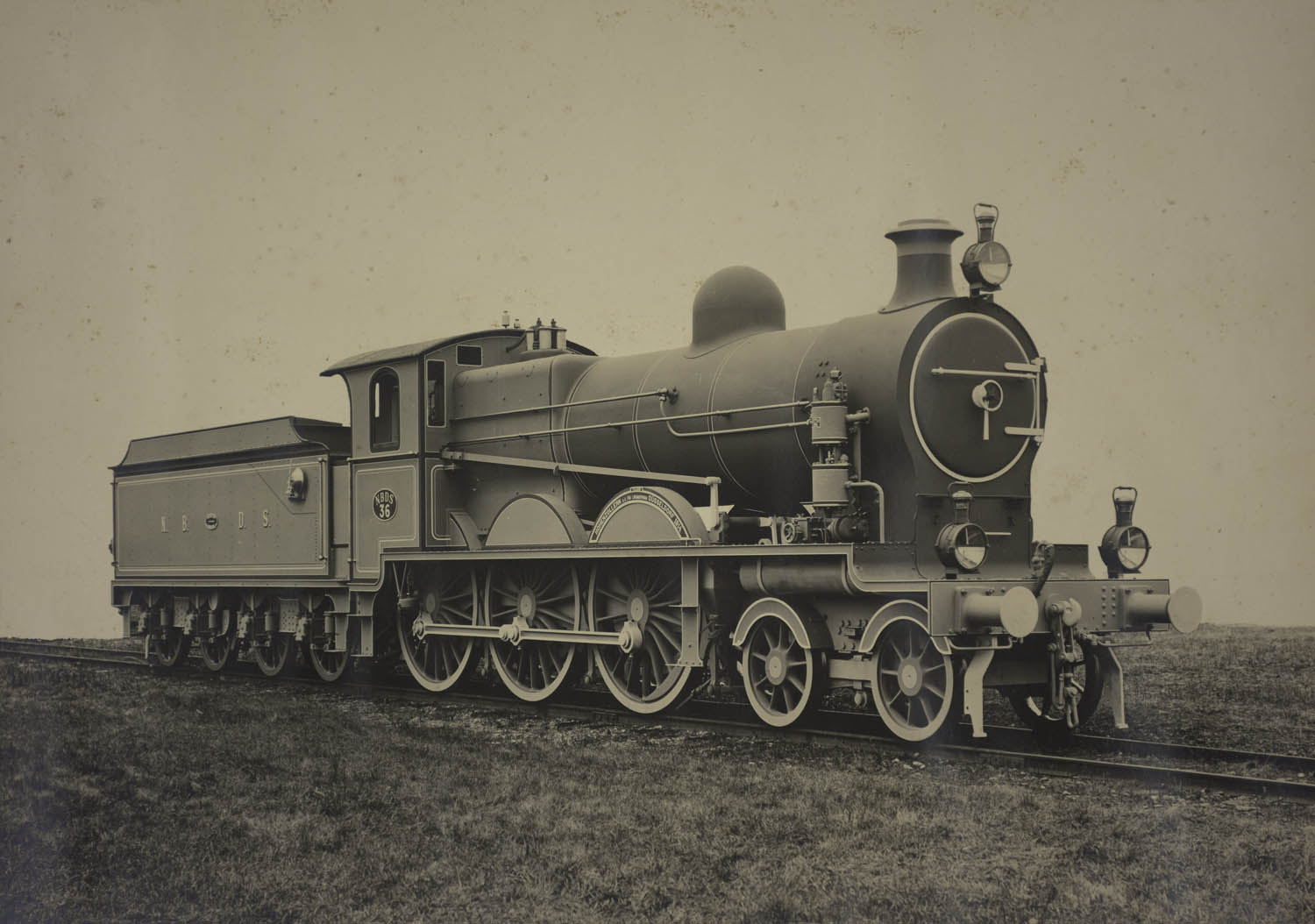
- Ns 3507 in 1914
Type and origin
- Power type: Steam
- Builder: Beyer, Peacock & Company, Hohenzollern
- Build date: 1908, 1914, 1920
- Total produced: 8
Specifications
- Configuration
  - Whyte: 4-6-0
  - UIC: 2'C
- Gauge: 1,435 mm (4 ft 8 1/2 in)
- Leading dia.: 1,026 mm (3 ft 4.4 in)
- Driver dia.: 1,980 mm (6 ft 6 in)
- Tender wheels: 1,219 mm (4 ft 0 in)
- Length: 17,881 mm (58 ft 8.0 in), 19,432 mm (63 ft 9.0 in) with the 8 wheeled tender
- Height: 4,248 mm (13 ft 11.2 in)
- Loco weight: 62 t (68 short tons; 61 long tons)
- Tender weight: 37.9 t (41.8 short tons; 37.3 long tons), 52 t (57 short tons; 51 long tons) for the 8 wheeled tender
- Fuel type: Coal
- Fuel capacity: 5 t (5.5 short tons; 4.9 long tons), 8 t (8.8 short tons; 7.9 long tons) with the 8 wheeled tender
- Water cap.: 15.9 m^{3} (3,500 imp gal), 20 m^{3} (4,400 imp gal) with the 8 wheeled tender
- Firebox
  - Grate area: 2.60 m^{2} (28.0 sq ft)
- Boiler pressure: 13.4 kg/cm^{2} (191 psi)
- Heating surface
  - Firebox: 13.5 m^{2} (145 sq ft)
  - Tubes: 95 m^{2} (1,020 sq ft)
- Superheater
  - Heating area: 34 m^{2} (370 sq ft)
- Cylinders: 2
- Cylinder size: 510 mm × 660 mm (20 in × 26 in)
- Valve gear: Walschaerts
Performance figures
- Maximum speed: 100 km/h (62 mph)
- Tractive effort: 8,130 kgf (17,900 lbf)
Career
- Operators: NBDS, SS, NS
- Power class: PO^{2}
- Numbers: NBDS: 30-36; SS: 981-988; NS: 3501-3508
- Nicknames: Grote Blauwen; Blauwe Brabanders
- Withdrawn: 1938 - 1946
- Disposition: All scrapped

The NS 3500 was a series of express train steam locomotives of Nederlandse Spoorwegen (NS) and its predecessors Noord-Brabantsch-Deutsche Spoorweg-Maatschappij (NBDS) and Maatschappij tot Exploitatie van Staatsspoorwegen (SS).

In 1907, the NBDS was the first railway company in the Netherlands to order express train locomotives with the wheel arrangement 2'C, which were delivered in 1908 by Beyer, Peacock & Company of Manchester, England and were put into service with the numbers 30–35. The larger companies Nederlandsche Centraal-Spoorweg-Maatschappij (NCS) and SS only introduced such express train locomotives two years later, the NCS 71–78, later NS 3600 and SS 700, later NS 3700.

In addition to being the first locomotives in the Netherlands with the 2'C wheel arrangement, these were also the first locomotives in the Netherlands with a boiler pressure of 14 atmospheres. The locomotives fully met the expectations: to transport heavy trains above the normal weight on time. After all, the post had to be in Berlin on time and the connection to the mail boat had to be made in Vlissingen. The colour of the locomotives was dark blue, trimmed with black tires and red piping. The tender and the lower part of the cab were given an extra embellishment, consisting of a wide white stripe outside the red one. The splacers were also kept blue. According to the manufacturer's custom, the wheel arches were trimmed with double brass edges, between which the name Beyer-Peacock. The brass number plates showed the letters NBDS and the number against a red background, while the sidewalls of the tenders had the letters NBDS painted in gold with a red shade. The wheels were red. Their balanced appearance and distinctive colour made them popular with the public, and they were soon called the Blauwe Brabanders or the great blues because of their colour.

The NBDS ordered these locomotives for the mail trains from Vlissingen via its own line between Boxtel and Wesel to Oberhausen and Haltern in competition with the SS. This connection came to an end because of the First World War. Because the NBDS had some locomotives surplus as a result, two or three locomotives were leased to the NCS between November 1915 and October 1919, which needed the extra locomotives due to having to waiting for rebuilding of locomotives 71–74. Due to regular exchange, the 30-32 and 34-35 have run regular services for the NCS.

Because of the good results with Nos. 30–35, two more locomotives were ordered from Hohenzollern before the First World War. Unlike the earlier locomotives, which were paired with a six-wheeled tender, the new locomotives were ordered with a larger four wheeled tender. The first one was delivered in 1914 and was given number 36. The second was delivered in 1920 and has no longer been given an NBDS number but has been put into service with the SS number 988. In 1919 the operations, locomotives and rollingstock were taken over by the SS, with the locomotives 30-36 being renumbered with the SS numbers 981–987. With the merging of the locomotives and rollingstock of the SS with that of the Hollandsche IJzeren Spoorweg-Maatschappij (HSM) in 1921, the locomotives were provided with the new NS numbers 3501–3508. In the NS era, the six wheeled tenders of Nos, 3503-3506 were swapped for 8 wheeled tenders from the NS 4500 series.

The withdrawal of these locomotives began in 1938 and 1939 with Nos. 3502, 3503, 3504, 3506 and 3507, which showed cracks in the frames. In 1940 the maximum speed of the remaining three locomotives was reduced to 50 km/h. No. 3508 was heavily damaged in the war years in Belgium and was officially withdrawn in 1946. Nos. 3501 and 3505 were withdrawn from service in early 1946 after the war.

== Overview ==
Builder	Lot No.	Date built	NBDS numBer	SS numBer	NS numBer	Withdrawn	Notes
Beyer, Peacock & Company	5134	1908	30	981	3501	1946	
Beyer, Peacock & Company	5135	1908	31	982	3502	1938	
Beyer, Peacock & Company	5136	1908	32	983	3503	1938	
Beyer, Peacock & Company	5137	1908	33	984	3504	1938	
Beyer, Peacock & Company	5138	1908	34	985	3505	1946	
Beyer, Peacock & Company	5139	1908	35	986	3506	1939	
Hohenzollern	3288	1914	36	987	3507	1938	
Hohenzollern	3328	1920		988	3508	1946	

== Duke of Brabant ==
At the beginning of 2012, it was decided to build a 3500 series locomotive in NBDS condition. This locomotive was supposed to be finished in 2018. In the first place, the intention was to get more people to choose a technical profession. The construction of the locomotive was also part of the plan "Brabantse Cultuur Hoofdstad 2018".

== Gallery ==
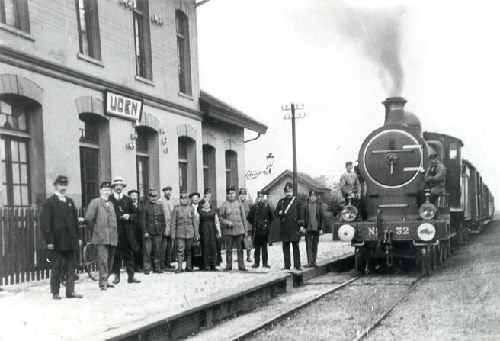
NS 3502 at Uden station.

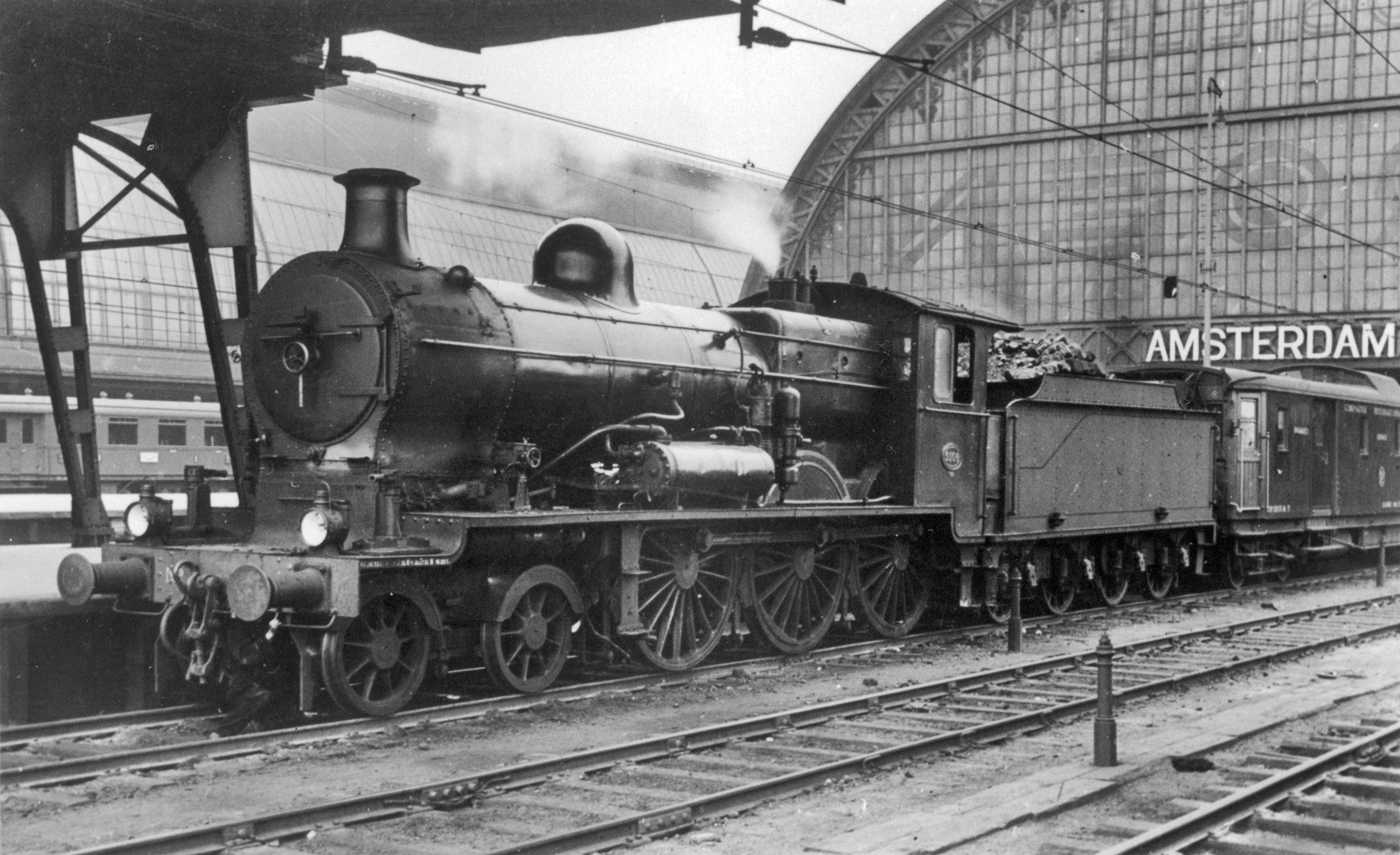
NS 3506 with a train at Amsterdam C.S. (Between 1930 and 1940)

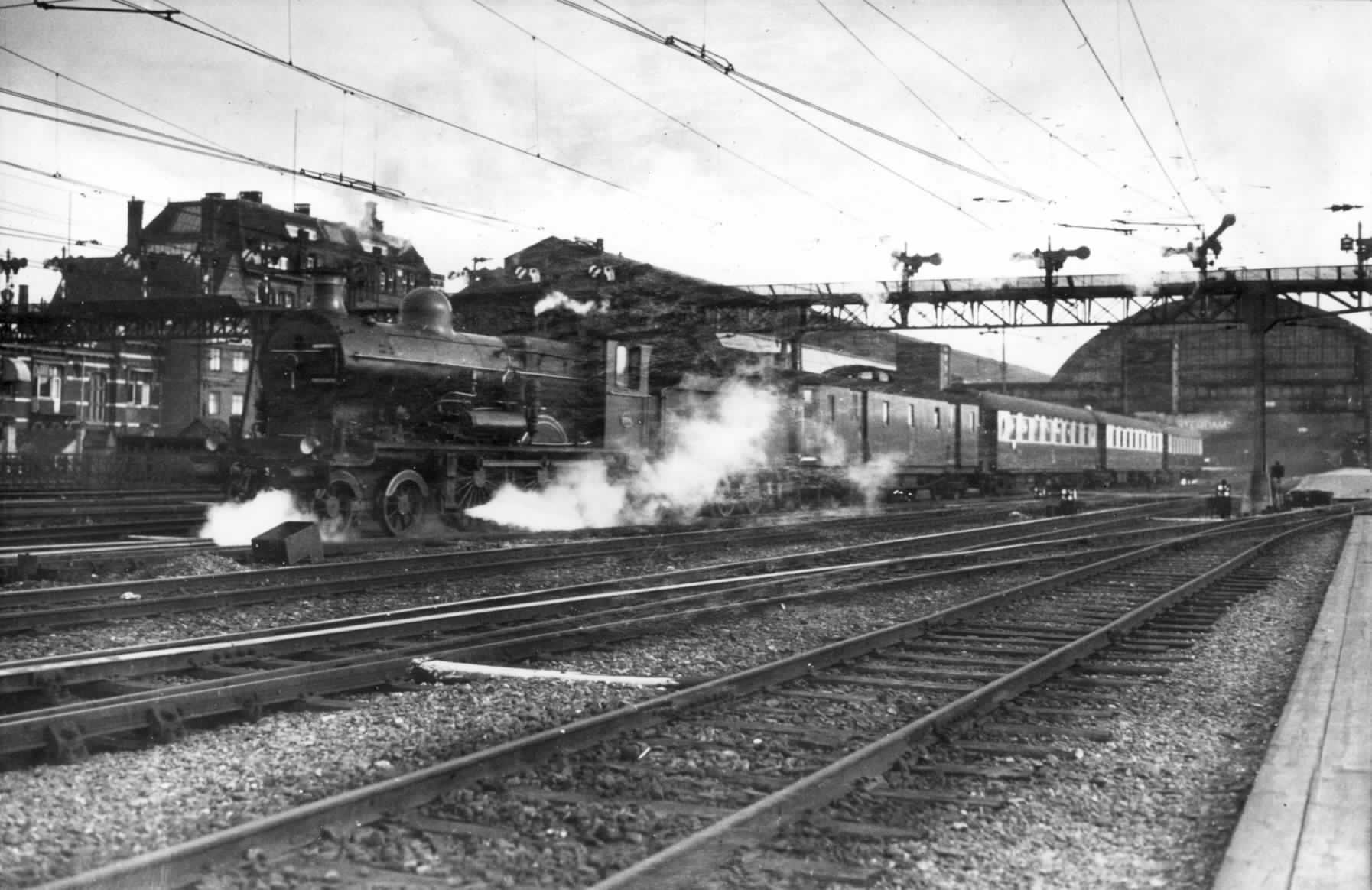
NS 3500 with a train on the west side of Amsterdam C.S (Between 1930 and 1940)

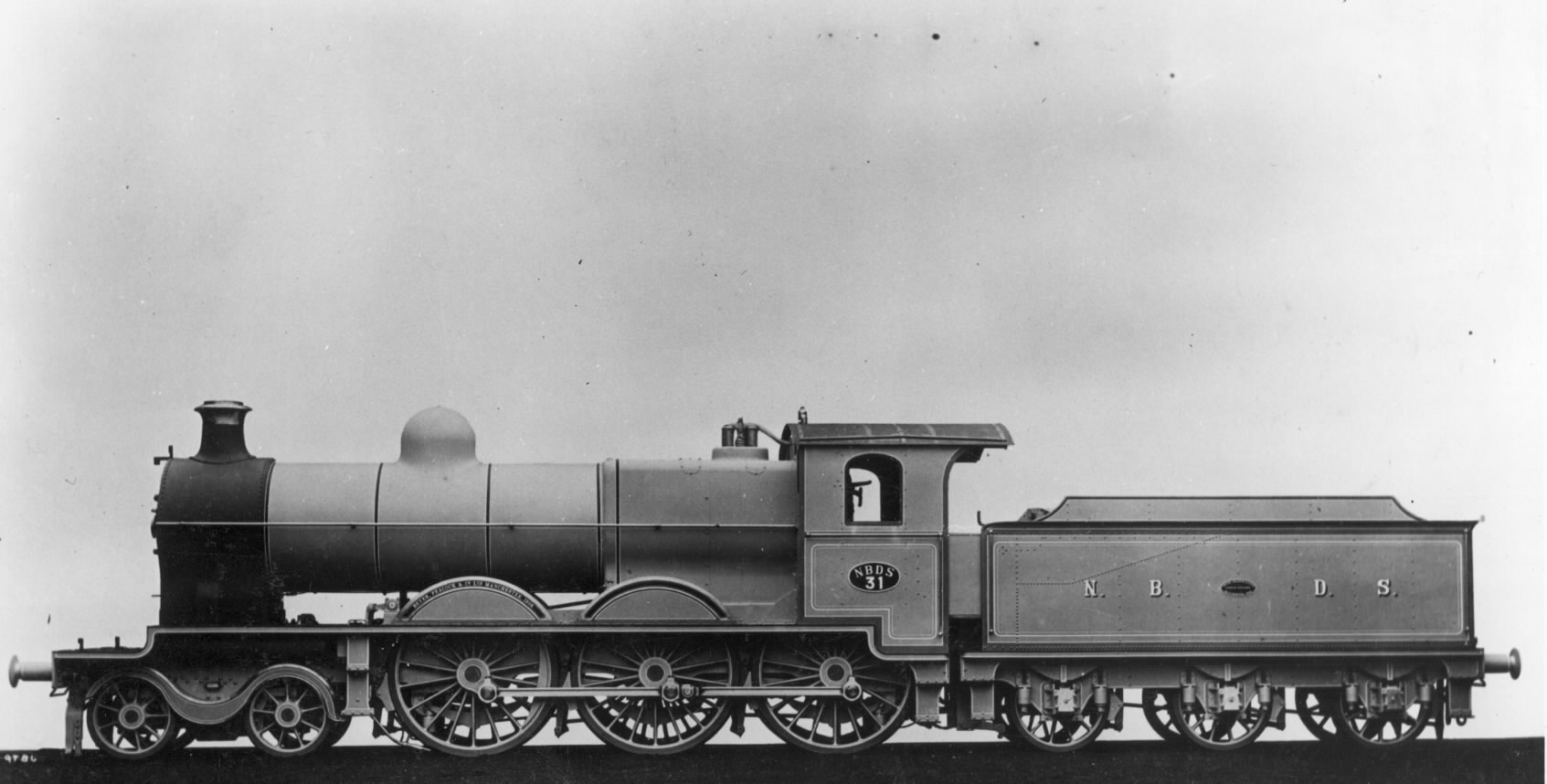
NS 3501 (ex-N.B.D.S. No. 31) (1908)

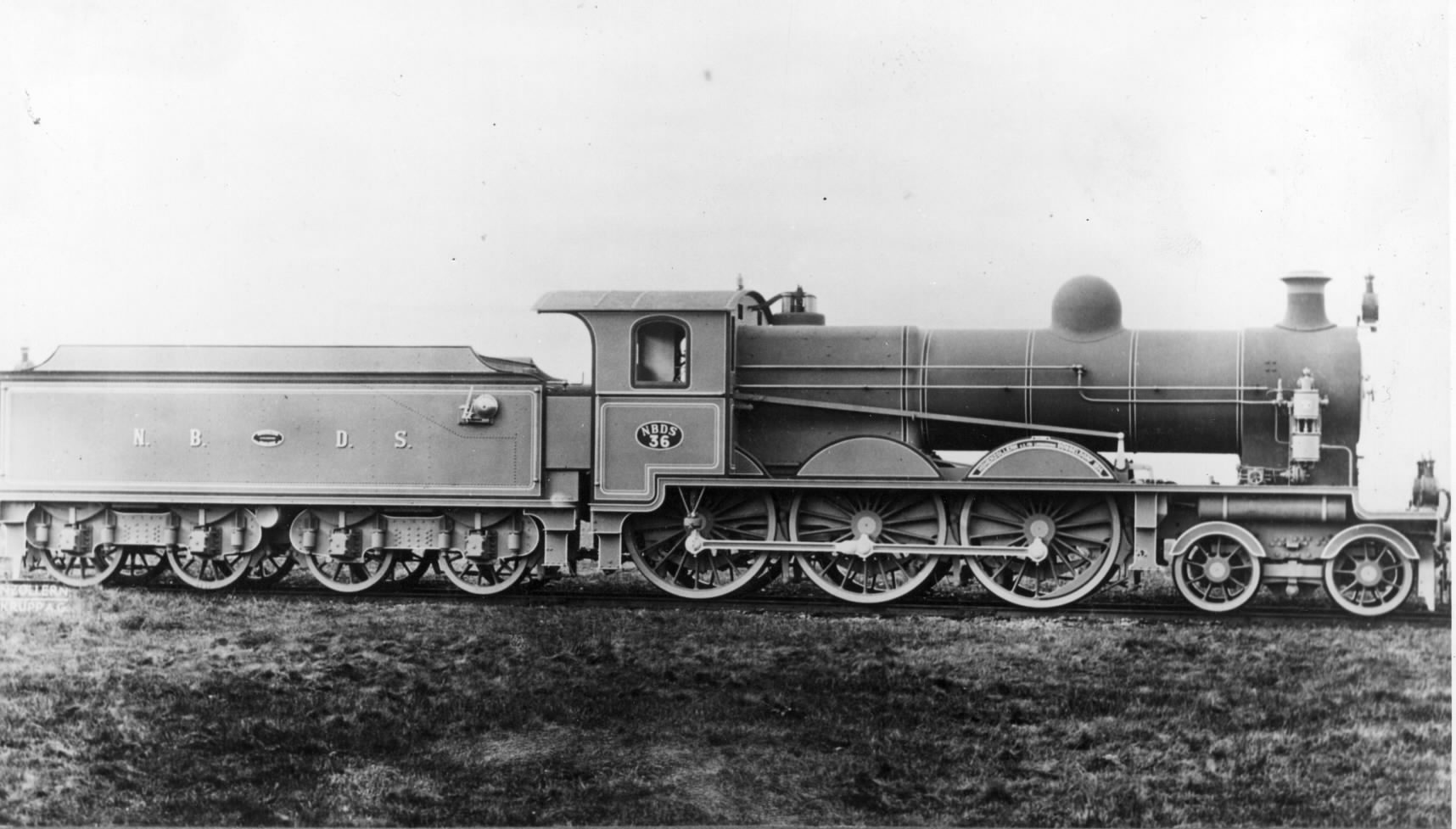
NS 3506 (ex-N.B.D.S. No. 36). (1914)

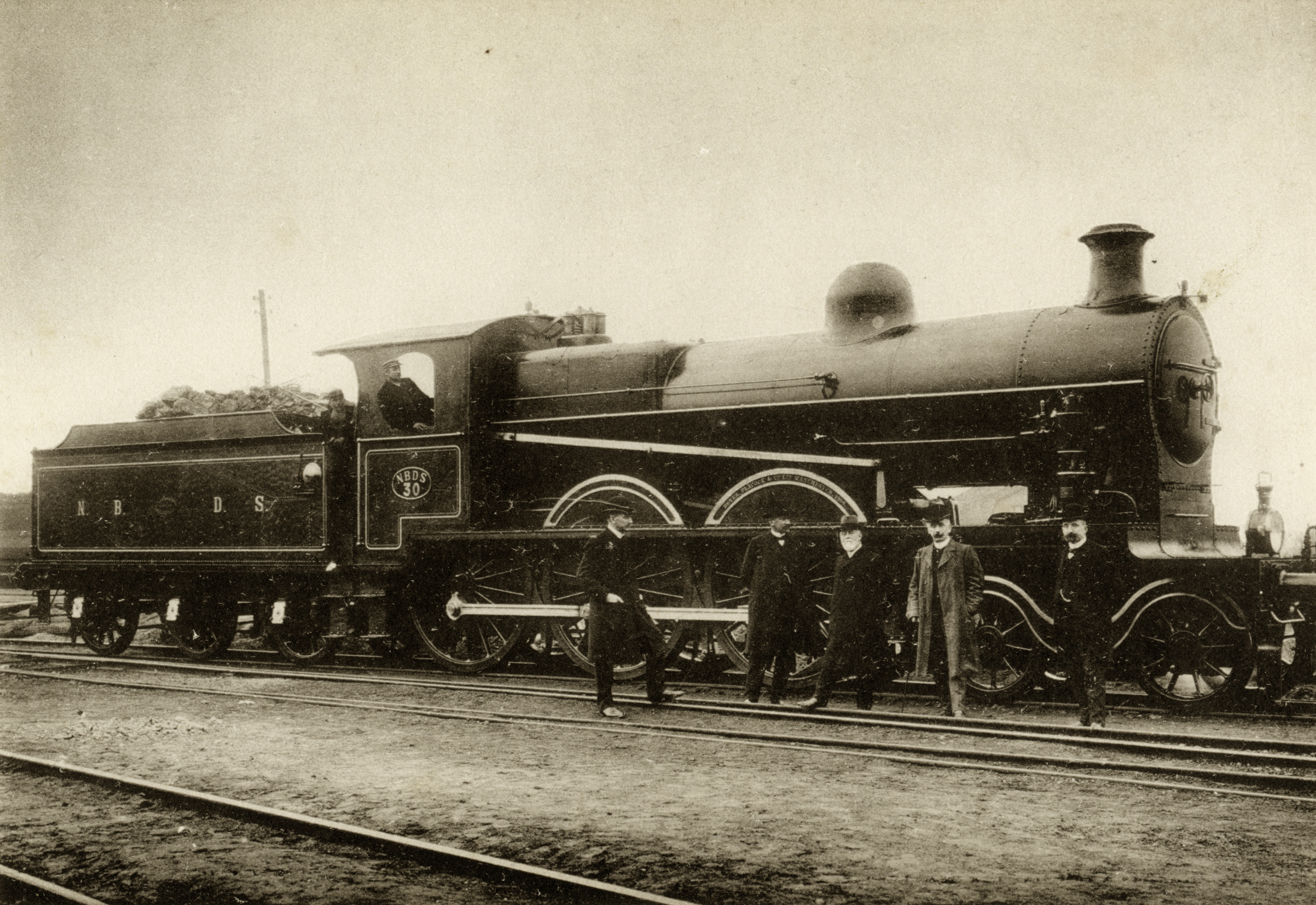
NS 3501 - N.B.D.S. No. 30 in Gennep (Between 1908 and 1913)

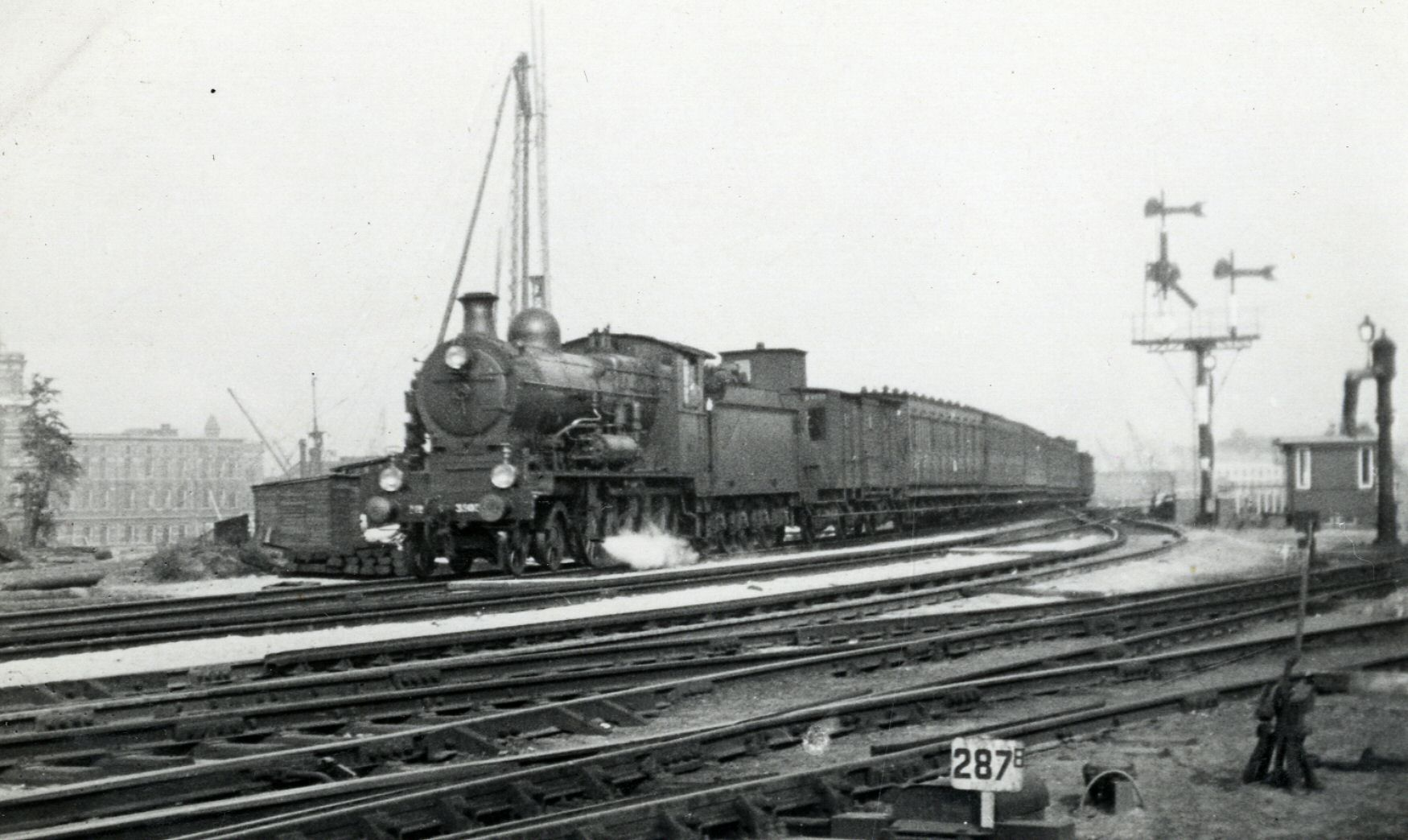
An NS 3500 with a passenger train (Between 1925 and 1935)

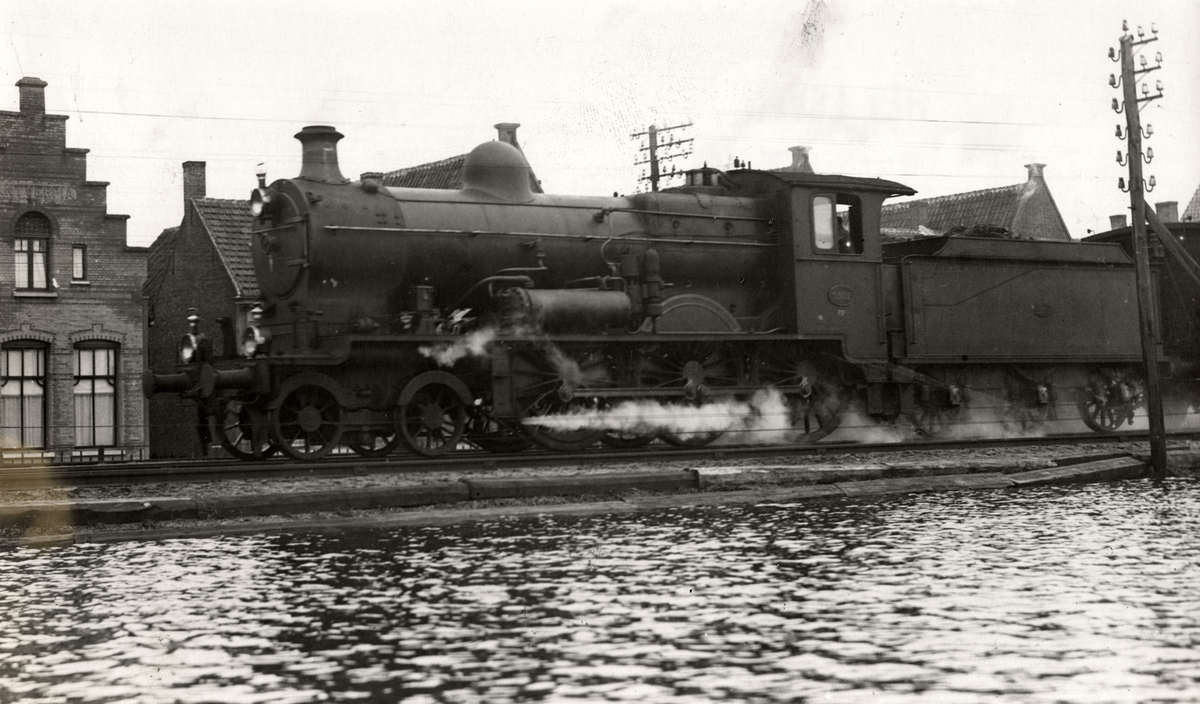
An NS 3500 series locomotive during a flood. (1926)

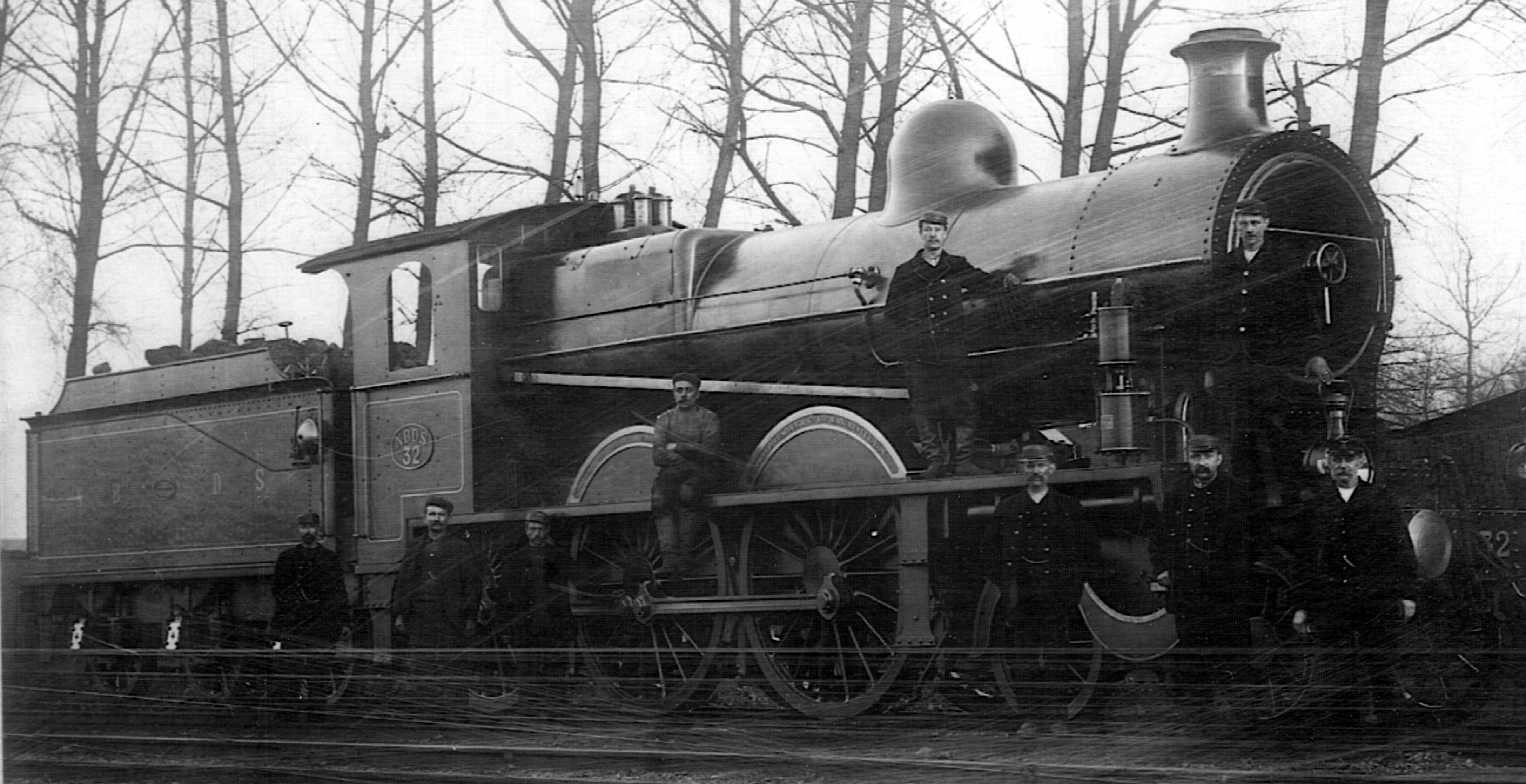
NBDS No. 32 in Gennep in 1908

== Sources and references ==
- N. J. van Wijck Jurriaanse: De Nederlandsche Centraal Spoorwegmaatschappij. Uitg. Wyt, Rotterdam, 1973. ISBN 90-6007-527-7.
