= Noord-Brabantsch-Duitsche Spoorweg-Maatschappij =

Railway company in the Netherlands (1873–1925)

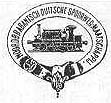

Overview
- Headquarters: Gennep
- Locale: The Netherlands
- Dates of operation: 1873–1925

Technical
- Track gauge: 1,435 mm (4 ft 8 1/2 in)
- Length: 92.7 km (57.6 mi)

The Noord-Brabantsch-Deutsche Spoorweg-Maatschappij (NBDS) was a railway company undertaking and providing rail transport between Boxtel and Wesel via Uden, Veghel, Gennep, Goch and Xanten. This railway was known in the Netherlands as "Duits lijntje " (German line). On July 15, 1873, the section from Boxtel to Goch could be opened. On July 1, 1878, the second section of the line, the section from Goch to Wesel, could be opened. The total length of the line was 92.7 kilometers, of which 52.7 kilometers on Dutch territory. From Büderich, another 8.2 kilometers of the Köln-Mindener Eisenbahn was used, so was a part of the line from Venlo via Wesel to Haltern, Münster and Hamburg.

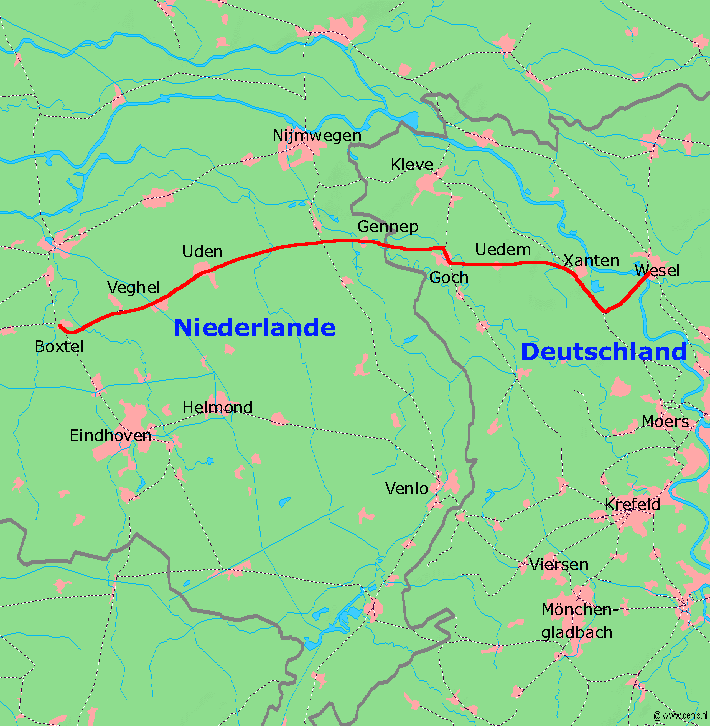
Route of het "Duitse lijntje"

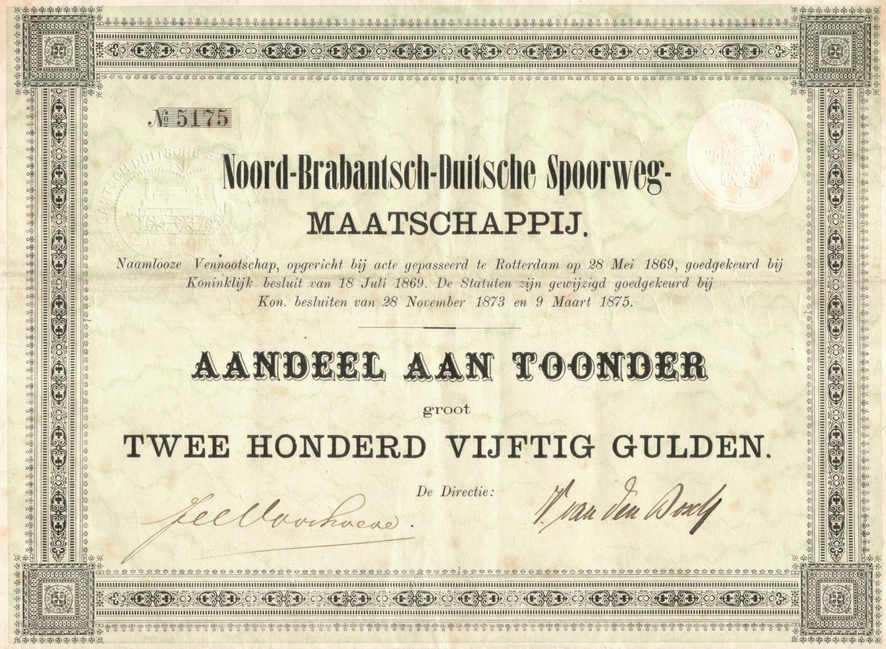
NBDS-Share

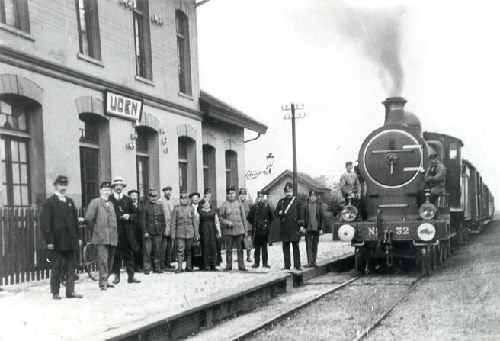
Steamlocomotive No. 32 at Uden station

== History ==
=== NBDS ===
On May 28, 1869, the Noord-Brabantsch-Deutsche Spoorweg-Maatschappij (NBDS) was founded. The purpose of the company was the transport of goods and people on the railways Boxtel - Gennep - Goch - Wesel and Gennep - Kleve. The board of directors of the company was as follows:

- President: Willem Hendrik van Meukeren, Rotterdam
- Vice President: Hyacinthus Constantinus Fredericus Kerstens, Mill
- Secretary: Jan van Stipriaan Luiscuis, Vlaardingen
- Maria Frans Rudolph Joseph Willem Hubert Ludwig Philip Apolina Baron von Monschauw, Goch
- Charles James Appleby, London
- Johannes van den Boogaard, Gennep

Subsequent presidents were Hyacinthus Constantinus Fredericus Kerstens (until 1886) and Johannes Marinus Voorhoeve (1886-1919).

On May 28, 1869, Van Meukeren received the final Dutch concession for the construction of a railway from Boxtel via Gennep to the Prussian borders in the directions to Kleve and Wesel. On February 14, 1872, the final concession of the Prussian government followed. The company was initially based in Rotterdam, but moved to Gennep. The central workshop was also located there. The NBDS line was opened with the intention of being part of the fastest London – Berlin – Saint Petersburg connection. From 1881 express trains (boat trains) ran on this line, with which one could travel from Vlissingen via Wesel to Berlin and Hamburg without having to change trains. From Vlissingen station, the journey could be continued with ships of the Stoomvaart Maatschappij Zeeland, which took the travelers to Queenborough. Here it was possible to transfer to the trains of the London, Chatham and Dover Railway towards London. Because of this comfort, many monarchs and diplomats made use of this route for their European travels. Postal carriages and passenger carriages from the CIWL (WL and WR) rode along on the trains (mail trains). The German border station was Goch and Hassum, the Dutch one was Gennep. The railway was called the "German Line"; in Germany, the name was Boxteler Bahn.

Between Büderich and Wesel, the NBDS used a 1950m long railway bridge over the Rhine. It was built between 1872 and 1874, as part of the construction of the Hamburg – Münster – Wesel – Straelen – Venlo line by the Köln-Mindener Eisenbahn. Another important work of art on the 100 km long section was the Maasbrug near Gennep.

The First World War put an end to this prominent traffic in 1914. During this period, mainly refugees from England and America made use of the NBDS through the then neutral Netherlands. On June 1, 1919, the SS took over the operations of the line. On November 15, 1922, the NBDS was declared bankrupt by the court of Rotterdam. July 1, 1925, the Deutsche Reichsbahn-Gesellschaft took over the German section of the railway. This meant that the railway company was now nationalized on both sides of the border. The workshop was closed that same year. Express trains no longer ran on this section. The line was relegated to sidelines on both sides. In the Netherlands, on August 1, 1924, the line became nothing more than a branch line.

=== The railway after bankruptcy ===
At the end of World War II, the railway bridge at Wesel was blown up by the retreating German Wehrmacht on March 10, 1945. the German section of het Duitse lijntje came to an end. In the years 1949-1967 the German part was closed and broken up (Goch – Hassum closed to passengers in 1949 and to goods in 1967 and Goch – Uedem closed to passengers in 1963 and to goods in 1966). During the Second World War, the section between Xanten and Uedem had been damaged so many times by Canadian soldiers that it was never repaired. A road was constructed on the Goch – Uedem route.

In 1950, the NS ended the last piece of passenger traffic on the Boxtel – Uden line. In 1970 goods traffic on the Uden – Gennep section was terminated. The Maasbrug near Gennep was dismantled in 1973. The adjacent road bridge was built in 1955 on a railway bridge that was intended to be the one that never existed. In 2004 Railion ended goods traffic on the part from Boxtel to Veghel.

In protest against ProRail's plans to break up the connection at Boxtel, trips were made on Easter Monday 2005 with a steam engine and a light rail vehicle.

== Locomotives and rolling stock ==
=== Locomotives ===
In 1873 the company had seven steam locomotives. Five tender engines were delivered in 1873 by Beyer, Peacock & Company of Manchester, England (numbers 1 to 5). These locomotives with the wheel arrangement 1'B (2-4-0) had the names "Gijsbert van Beverwijk", "Sophia", "Mina", "Lucinda" and "Henriëtta".

Before that, two tank engines had already been put into service. These were built by Fox, Walker & Company of Bristol (including number 11) and built in 1871–1872.

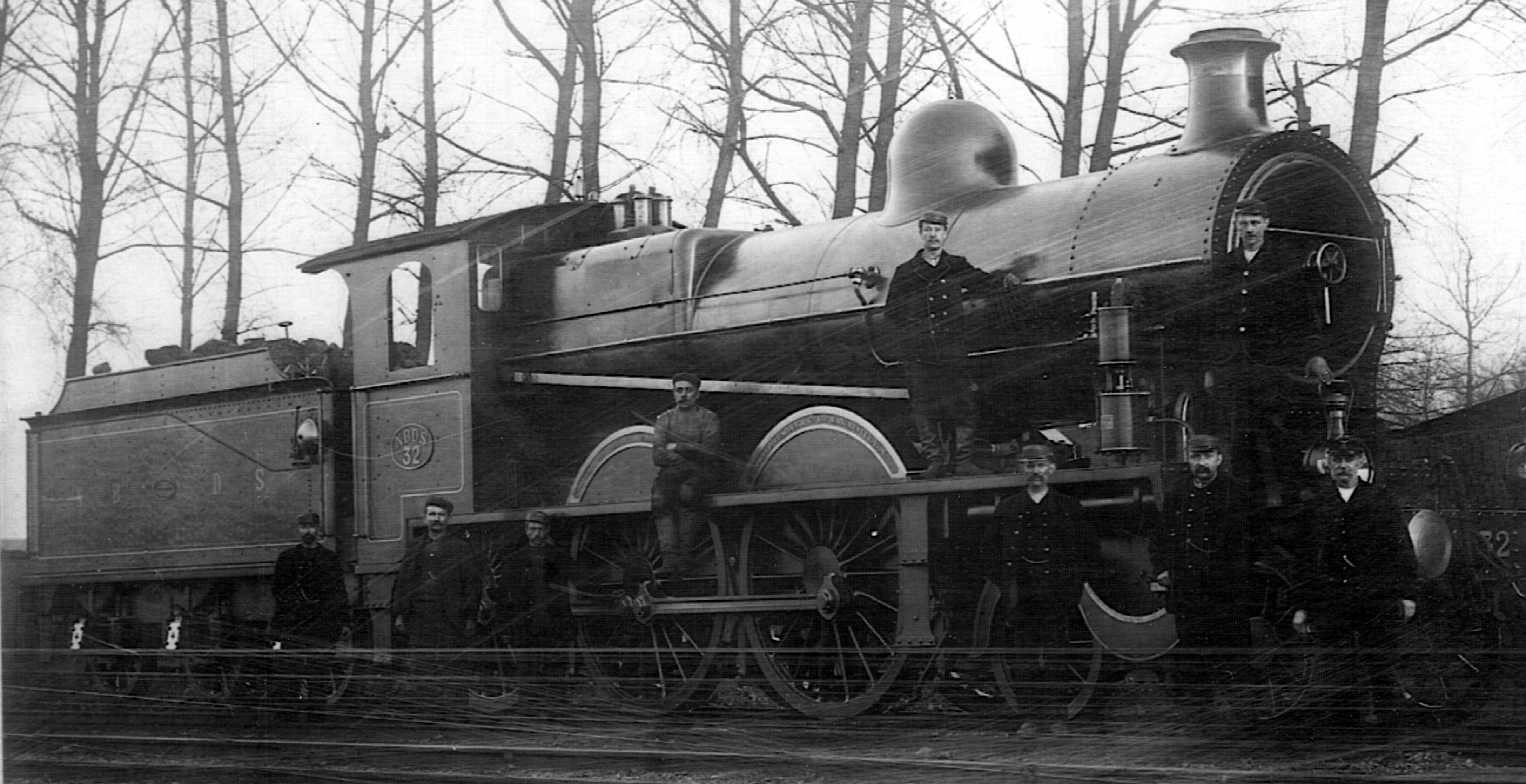
Locomotive No. 32 in Gennep 1908

For goods traffic, four C (0-6-0) locomotives were delivered in 1878 from Hohenzollern Locomotive Works, Düsseldorf. These were given the numbers 12 to 15. Two more followed in 1902 (no. 16) and 1907 (no. 17).

Two heavier 1'B (2-4-0) locomotives were purchased from Hohenzollern in 1881 to pull the express trains, followed by a third one in 1887 (numbers 8 to 10).Between 1892 and 1894 three more locomotives were purchased, again 1'B (2-4-0) locomotives, built by Beyer-Peacock & Company. These had the numbers 6, 7 and 11.

The increasingly heavier postal trains made the NBDS decide in 1907 to purchase even bigger express locomotives with the 2'C (4-6-0) wheel arrangement. These were the first locomotives to use this wheel arrangement in the Netherlands. Six engines arrived in 1908, numbers 30-35 (later NS 3500). Since they had not yet gained experience with 2'C locomotives in the Netherlands, the NBDS had the locomotives built in England by Beyer-Peacock, Manchester. on a few occasions, These locomotives nicknamed 'Blauwe Brabanders' (Blue Brabander) ran express trains all the way to Haltern, Münster, Essen, Dortmund or to Oberhausen. As late as World War I, a new 2'C (4-6-0) No. 36 and two new 1'D (2-8-0) Nos. 118 and 119 goods locomotives and were delivered by Hohenzollern, Düsseldorf. The NBDS also had three shunting locomotives with the wheel arrangement B t (0-4-0T). Number 26 was built in 1894 and was built by Henschel & Company in Kassel. This manufacturer also built number 26 in 1898. In 1907 another shunting locomotive with number 24 was built by Werkspoor in Amsterdam. The NBDS had its own workshop in Gennep for the maintenance of the locomotives and rollingstock.

Builder	Lot no.	Date built	Wheel arrangement	NBDS no.	SS no.	NS no.	Notes
Beyer, Peacock & Company	1169-1173	1873	1'B	1-5	?	775 (lok 1)	In 1908 Nos. 2 and 4 were sold to a contractor.
Beyer, Peacock & Company	3539	1893	1'B	6	476	1476	Withdrawn from service in 1936.
Beyer, Peacock & Company	3523	1892	1'B	7	477	1477	Withdrawn from service in 1933.
Hohenzollern	161, 162	1881	1'B	8,9	281, 282	1201, 1202	Withdrawn from service in 1932.
Hohenzollern	428	1887	1'B	10	283	1203	Withdrawn from service in 1932.
Fox, Walker & Company	?	1871	C t	?	-	-	Sold in 1887
Fox, Walker & Company	?	1872	C t	11	-	-	Sold in 1882 to contractor Bekker
Beyer, Peacock & Company	3614	1894	1'B	11"	478	1478	Withdrawn from service in 1936.
Hohenzollern	82-85	1878	C t	12-15	215-218	3001-3004	Sold in 1925 to the Railway Construction Company
Hohenzollern	1614	1903	C t	16	219	3005	Sold in 1925 to the Railway Construction Company
Hohenzollern	2254	1907	C t	17	220	3006	Sold in 1925 to the Railway Construction Company
Werkspoor	209	1907	B t	24	561	8232	Withdrawn from service in 1947.
Henschel	4136	1894	B t	25	526	6910	Withdrawn from service in 1931.
Henschel	4828	1898	B t	26	527	6911	Withdrawn from service in 1934.
Beyer, Peacock & Company	5134-5139	1908	2'C	30-35	981-986	3501-3506	Blue Brabander
Hohenzollern	3288	1915	2'C	36	987	3507	Blue Brabander
Hohenzollern	3328	1920	2'C	(37)	988	3508	Blue Brabander
Hohenzollern	3324, 3325	1917, 1918	1'D	118, 119	1301, 1302	4501, 4502	120 and 121 entered service with the SS as Nos. 1303 and 1304.

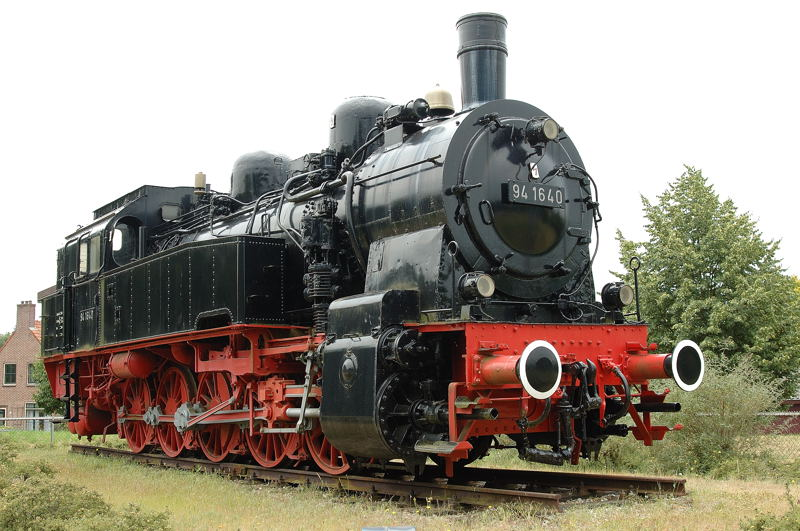
Monumental steam locomotive 94 1640 of the Deutsche Bundesbahn in Gennep

Since February 19, 1977, a steam locomotive has been placed near the Brabantweg in Gennep in memory of the NBDS. This monument is a former tank engine of the Deutsche Bundesbahn with the number 94 1640. This class never been service with the NBDS. Not a single locomotive of the NBDS itself has survived.

=== Passenger rolling stock ===
Builder	Date built	Type	Description	Wheel arrangement	NBDS no.	NS no.	Notes
?	1893	As	1st class	?	1	A 2501	In 1904 to NBDS (formerly Royal Carriage No. 45)
?	?	A2'C	1st class	?	4	AB 2501	In 1904 to NBDS (formerly Royal Carriage No. 41)
?	1865	AB4	1st/2nd class	?	5	C 2061	In 1904 to NBDS (formerly Royal Carriage No. 42)
?	1877	A	1st class	?	?	-	-
Beijnes (1873)	1873 (7,8), 1878 (9-12)	AB4	1st/2nd class	2	7-12	AB 2005	-
?	?	ABC4	1st/2nd/3rd class	?	?	-	-
?	1905	AB5c	1st/2nd class	3	15-20	AB 4515-4520	-
?	1878	AB4	1st/2nd class	?	29	BC 2011	-
Beijnes	1873-1874	B4	2nd class	2	30-35	BC 2012-2017	-
?	1878	AB4	1st/2nd class	?	36	BC 2018	-
?	1873-1874	C5	3rd class	2	41-64	C 2101–2108, 2112–2217, 2119	-
?	1876-1877	C5	3rd class	2	65-72	C 2109–2111, 2118, 2120-2123	-
?	1873	L	Post	?	73-76	P 2501-2504	-
?	1892	?	Baggage	3	77-84	-	Taken over from the SS. in 1899
?	1873	?	Baggage	2	85-88	D 2277	-
?	1894	E	Baggage	2	89-94	D 2272–2276, PD 2001	Baggage coach
?	1894	?	Baggage	?	95	D 2233	In 1904 to NBDS (formerly Royal Carriage No. 43)
?	1873	?	Baggage	?	106, 107	-	-
?	1873	?	Baggage	2	151-155	-	-
?	1902	?	Baggage	3	950-961	D 3219-960	For D-trains.
?	1904	?	Baggage	2' 2'	970-973	D 7574, 7575, 7506, 7507	For Berlin mail trains.
?	1905	?	Baggage	2' 2'	974-977	D 7508, 7576, 7509, 7577	For Berlin mail night trains.
?	1908	?	Baggage	2' 2'	978-981	D 7578-7581	-
?	1913	?	Baggage	2' 2'	982-984	D 7582-7584	-

=== Goods rollingstock ===
Builder	Date built	Type	Description	Wheel arrangement	NBDS no.	NS no.	Notes
?	1905	?	Steam crane	?	?	Hoist 451	
?	1915	?	Hand crane	?	6	?	
Carl Weyer	1873	F	Closed van	2	101-110	CHA 2536-2574	
Werkspoor, Carl Weyer	1872	F	Closed van	2	111-150	CHA 397–404, 2543, 2547–2560, 2563, 2565–2570, 2572-2574	
Werkspoor	1873	F	Closed van	2	151-155	CGA 316-319	
Carl Weyer	1873	F	Closed van	2	175	CHA 396	
Dyle & Backalan	1890	F	Closed van	2	176-179	CHB 2826–2828, FOT 71051	
Dyle & Backalan	1890	F	Closed van	2	180-195	FOT 70901-70910	
Germain	1891	F	Closed van	2	196-203	CHB 2829–2835, FOT 71052	
Germain	1891	F	Closed van	2	204-235	CHB 407-438	
Germain	1895	?	Refrigerated wagon	?	236-240	CHY 26051–26054, 26953	For margarine transport
Germain	1895	?	Refrigerated wagon	?	241-255	CHY 26001–26014, 26905	For margarine transport
vd Zypen & Carlier	1897	F	Closed van	2	256-260	CHD 12001-12005	Built to Prussian model
vd Zypen & Carlier	1897	F	Closed van	2	261-275	CHD 10001–10014, FOT 71001	Built to Prussian model
Nivelles	1898	F	Closed van	2	276-280	CHD 12016-12020	Built to Prussian model
Nivelles	1898	F	Closed van	2	281-295	CHD 10016–10028, FOT 71002	Built to Prussian model
Gastell	1901	F	Closed van	2	296-305	CHD 12006–12014, FOT 71053	Built to Prussian model
Gastell	1901	F	Closed van	2	306-317	CHD 12021–12031, 15175, FOT 71054	Built to Prussian model
Gastell	1901	F	Closed van	2	318-365	CHD 10031–10077, FC 70579, 70580	Built to Prussian model
Werkspoor	1873	G	Open wagon	2	441-465	GTG 35816-35846	
Werkspoor	1873	G	Open wagon	2	466-485	GTG 37456-37460	
Werkspoor	1873	G	Open wagon	2	486-496	-	
Werkspoor	1873	G	Open wagon	2	516-525	GTG 37401-37409	
Gastell	1901	G	Open wagon	2	530-554	GTM 53471-53495	
Gastell	1902	G	Open wagon	2	555-579	GTM 58031-58035	
Nürnberg	1916	G	Open wagon	2	1581-1590	GTM 53501-53510	
Wismar	1916	G	Open wagon	2	1591-1600	GTM 53511-53520	
Union Dortmund	1916	G	Open wagon	2	1601-1630	GTM 53521-53540	
Nürnberg	1916	G	Open wagon	2	1603, 1605	GTM 58051, 58052	
Union Dortmund	1916	G	Open wagon	2	1610	GTM 58056, 58059	
Wismar	1917	G	Open wagon	2	?	GTM 58053–58055, 58060	
NBDS	1873	?	Ballast wagon	?	580-585	service wagon 171109-172112	
NBDS	1883	?	Stake wagon	2'2'	600, 601	HTR	For rail transport
Gastell	1901	?	express train wagon	3	700-704	CHCW	
Gastell	1902	?	Refrigerated wagon	?	750-752	CHY	For margarine transport
Gastell	1902	?	Refrigerated wagon	?	753-755	CHV	For margarine transport
Gastell	1902	?	Refrigerated wagon	?	756, 757	CHV	For margarine transport
Gastell	1902	?	Refrigerated wagon	?	758, 759	CHY	For margarine transport
Gastell	1901	?	Stake wagon	?	801-830	LW	
Gastell	1908	?	Stake wagon	?	831-845	LW	
Werkspoor	1873	?	Ballast wagon	?	850	-	
NBDS	1873	?	Ballast wagon	?	871-876	-	
Werkspoor	1873	?	Flat wagon	2	871-880	HM 90561-90574	5 units of two wagon
Werkspoor	1873	?	Flat wagon	2	881-890	HM 90561-90574	5 units of two wagon
Werkspoor	1873	?	Open cattle wagon	2	913-932	CHA 2458–2472, CHBL 3548–3550, FU 70146, 71201	
Nivelles	1908	K	cattle wagon	?	1020-1023	FVVBS 77901-77904	For pig transport
?	1911	?	Meat wagon	?	2025, 2026	?	
?	1911	?	Meat wagon	?	3025	?	
Gastell	1913	?	Gas wagon	3	2059	155075	
Uerdingen	1910	?	Tank wagon	?	502202p	Recorded at DR	Property of the "Niederrheinische Oelwerke Actien-Gesellschaft Goch"

== Sources and references ==
- W.S. van Dinter: Gedenkschrift Noord-Brabantsch-Duitsche Spoorwegmaatschappij en Spoormonument Lok 94 te Gennep, Gennep: Noord Limburgse Boekhandel 1982.
- J.W.M. Peijnenburg, V.M. Freriks: De spoorlijn Boxtel - Wezel in „Kruispunt Beugen“, Nijmegen - Venlo 1983.
- Michael Lehmann: Der Blaue Brabant – Die Geschichte der Boxteler Bahn. ISBN 3-9802229-4-2
- Hans Schlieper, Vincent Freriks. Die Boxteler Bahn, Die Nord-Brabant-Deutsche Eisenbahn-Gesellschaft und die internationale Vlissinger Postroute. DGEG Werl 2014 ISBN 978-3-937189-79-6
- Die Boxteler Bahn
- Die Geschichte der Nord-Brabant-Deutsche Eisenbahn Gesellschaft (NBDS).
