= 6100 =

6100 or variation, may refer to:

== In general ==
- A.D. 6100, a year in the 7th millennium CE
- 6100 BC, a year in the 7th millennium BCE
- 6100, a number in the 6000 (number) range

== Electronics and computing ==
- Intersil 6100, a microprocessor CPU chip
- Nokia 6100, a cellphone
- Power Macintosh 6100 personal computer

== Other uses ==
- 6100 Kunitomoikkansai, an asteroid in the Asteroid Belt, the 6100th asteroid registered; see List_of_minor_planets:_6001–7000
- GWR 6100 Class, a side tank locomotive train class
- NS 6100, a Dutch tank engine locomotive train class
