= NS 3700 =

Class of Dutch steam locomotives

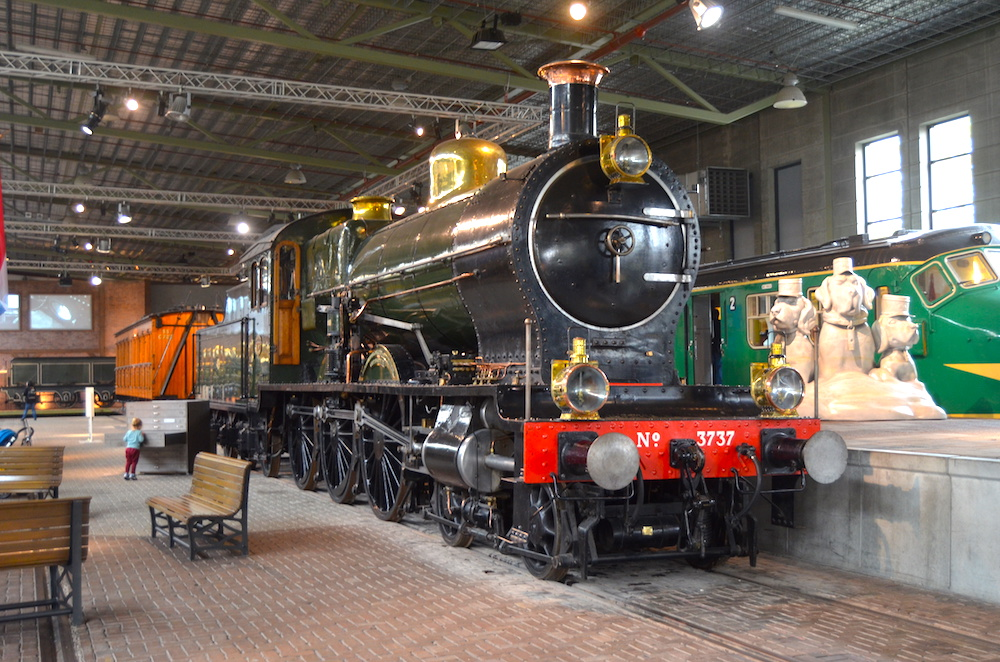
Type and origin
- Power type: Steam
- Builder: Beyer, Peacock & Company, Werkspoor, Henschel & Son, Hanomag, Schwartzkopff
- Build date: 1910 - 1928
- Total produced: 120
Specifications
- Configuration
  - Whyte: 4-6-0
  - UIC: 2'C
- Gauge: 1,435 mm (4 ft 8 1/2 in)
- Leading dia.: 915 mm (3 ft 0 in)
- Driver dia.: 1,850 mm (6 ft 1 in)
- Tender wheels: 1,220 mm (4 ft 0 in)
- Length: 3701-3720: 19,450 mm (63 ft 10 in); 3721-3784: 18,480 mm (60 ft 8 in); 3785-3790: 18,580 mm (60 ft 11 in); 3791-3815: 18,480 mm (60 ft 8 in); 3816-3820: 19,700 mm (64 ft 8 in)
- Height: 4,520 mm (14 ft 10 in)
- Loco weight: 72.2 t (79.6 short tons; 71.1 long tons)
- Tender weight: 43 t (47 short tons; 42 long tons)
- Fuel type: Coal
- Fuel capacity: 6 t (6.6 short tons; 5.9 long tons)
- Water cap.: 18 m^{3} (4,000 imp gal)
- Firebox
  - Type: Belpaire
  - Grate area: 2.84 m^{2} (30.6 sq ft)
- Boiler pressure: 12 bar (170 psi) superheated
- Heating surface
  - Firebox: 15.44 m^{2} (166.2 sq ft)
  - Tubes: 144.89 m^{2} (1,559.6 sq ft)
- Superheater
  - Heating area: 41 m^{2} (440 sq ft)
- Cylinders: 4
- Cylinder size: 400 mm × 600 mm (16 in × 24 in)
- Valve gear: Walschaerts
- Loco brake: Air Brake
Performance figures
- Maximum speed: 110 km/h (68 mph)
- Power output: 1,350 PS (990 kW)
- Tractive effort: 3701-3815: 94.05 kN (21,140 lbf); 3816-3820: 103.7 kN (23,300 lbf)
Career
- Operators: SS, NS
- Power class: PO^{3}
- Numbers: SS: 685-778, 785-799; NS: 3701-3820
- Nicknames: Jumbo and Potvis (Potvis only applied to the streamlined locomotives)
- Withdrawn: 1958
- Disposition: 1 preserved, 119 scrapped

The NS 3700 class engine is a class of express steam locomotives with the wheel arrangement of 2'C (4-6-0) tender engine of Nederlandse Spoorwegen (NS) and its predecessor Maatschappij tot Exploitatie van Staatsspoorwegen (SS).

== History ==
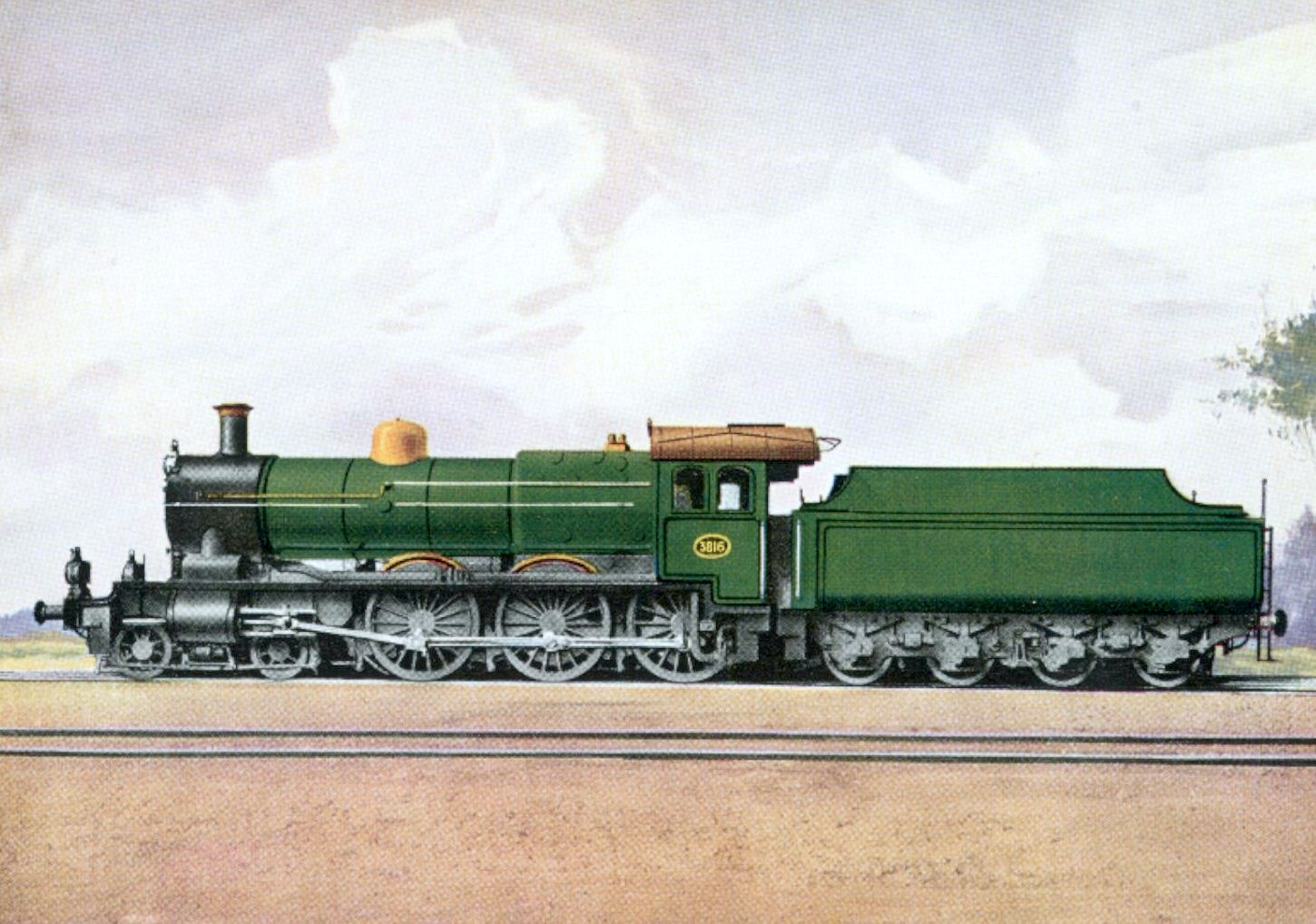
Steam locomotive NS 3816; circa 1930. Collection of the Utrecht Archives.

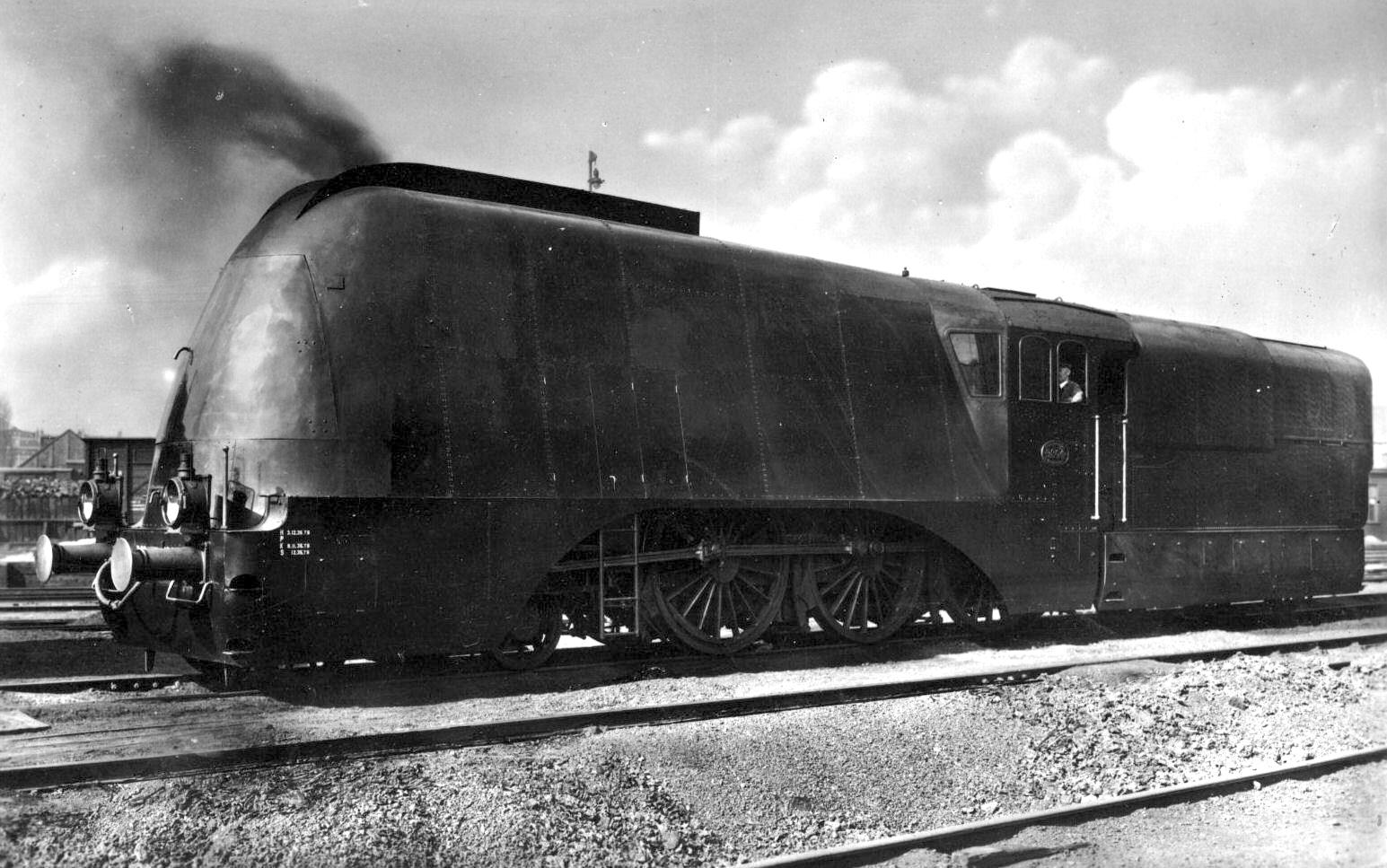
Steam locomotive NS 3804 with its streamlining casing (nickname 'Potvis'); circa 1936. Collection of the Utrecht Archives.

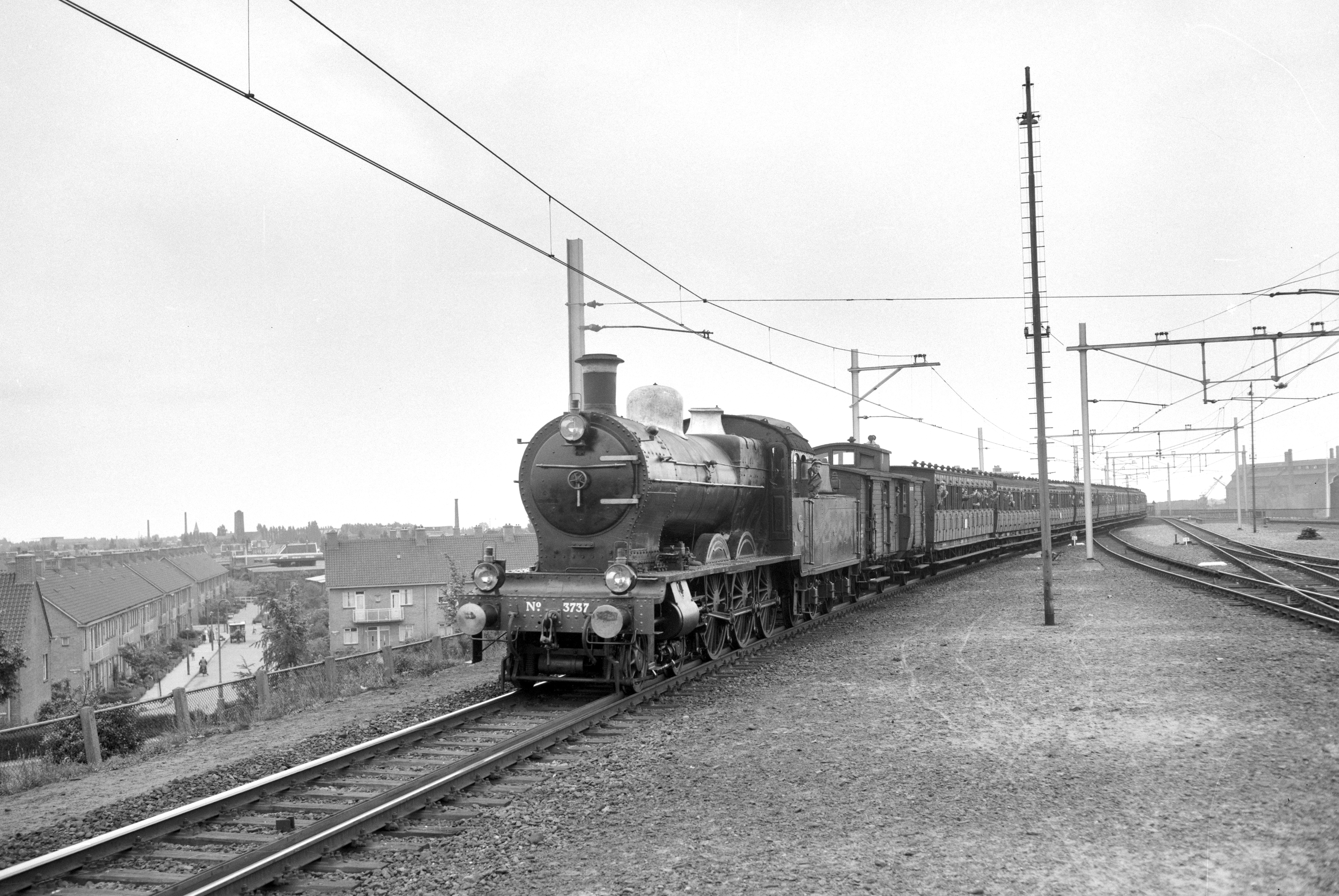
On the occasion of the 25th anniversary of the NVBS, an anniversary, a rail tour was organized on 16 June 1956 with locomotive 3737. The locomotive with a train consisting of wooden carriages.

The first 109 locomotives of this series were delivered to the SS between 1910 - 1920 and numbered 685 - 778 and 785 - 799. The manufacturers were Beyer, Peacock & Company (36 engines), Werkspoor (48 engines), Hanomag (10 engines) and Henschel & Son (15 engines). After the merger of the SS and the HSM in 1921, six more locomotives were delivered by Werkspoor in that same year. The series was then given the NS numbers 3701–3815. In 1928 another order of five locomotives were ordered from Schwarzkopff and built to a slightly altered design. The whole classed was numbered between 3701 - 3820 after the last ones were added to the fleet.

SS Number	NS nummers	Date	Built by	Lot No.	Additional notes
701-706	3701-3706	1910	Beyer, Peacock & Company	5370-5375	
707-718	3707-3718	1911	Beyer, Peacock & Company	5451-5462	
731-742	3737-3748	1911	Werkspoor		Engine NS 3737 is preserved at the Spoorwegmuseum
743-750	3749-3756	1912	Werkspoor		
719-730	3719-3730	1913	Beyer, Peacock & Company	5640-5651	
695-700	3731-3736	1913	Beyer, Peacock & Company	5721-5726	
751-760	3757-3766	1913/1914	Werkspoor		
761-766	3767-3772	1915	Werkspoor		
767-778	3773-3784	1918/1919	Werkspoor		
785-799	3791-3805	1920	Henschel & Son	17744-17758	
685-694	3806-3815	1920	Hanomag	9343-9352	
(779-784)	3785-3790	1921	Werkspoor		Ordered by the SS but entered service with the NS numbers
	3816-3820	1928	Schwartzkopff	9336-9340	Orderded by the NS and entered service with NS numbers

The Noord-Brabantsch-Duitsche Spoorweg-Maatschappij (NBDS) was the first railway company in the Netherlands to use express locomotives with the wheel arrangement 2'C (4-6-0) engine in 1908 (NBDS 30–35, later NS 3500). They achieved good results with them, so the SS asked to test one of these locomotives on their line between Amsterdam and Emmerich. This test was a great success, after seeing how successful the locomotives were the SS also bought 2'C (4-6-0) express locomotives. The NBDS locomotives only had two inside cylinders, the SS opted for a locomotive with four cylinders.

The locomotives were designed by the SS, looking to British locomotive design for inspiration, for pulling (express)passenger trains. Compared to the SS series 801 - 935 (NS 1701 - 1835), the NS 3700 class engine had twice the amount of power, and were therefore nicknamed "Jumbo". This series quickly became important for pulling trains in the Netherlands. They had to hand over their heaviest express trains to their stronger brothers of the NS 3900 class engine after 1929. After they experienced problems with the new Mat'34 that was supposed to provide fast connections between the major cities, they used a locomotive of the NS 3700 class engine to replace them. With these so-called steam diesels services, speeds of more than 120 km/h were achieved.

The locomotives of the NS 3700 class had either a three- or four-axle tender to carry the necessary amount of coal and water. In 1929 a tank version ("Tender jumbos") appeared with a wheel arrangement of 2'C2' (4-6-4) engine as the NS 6100 series. Ten of these locomotives were built (five locomotives were built by Hohenzollern and the other five by Werkspoor). A lighter tank engine was previously built by Beyer, Peacock & Company with only two inside cylinders and a slightly smaller boiler, the NS 6000 engine series.

== Locomotive 3737 ==
Locomotive 3737, built in 1911 as engine SS 731 by Werkspoor, as the sole survivor engine of her class, made her first test run between Amsterdam and Utrecht on 28 August 1911. She officially entered service on 11 September 1911. Locomotive 3737 (allocated to Roosendaal shed) ran the last official NS steam hauled service from Geldermalsen to Utrecht Maliebaan on 7 January 1958, where the Spoorwegmuseum was already located at that time. The locomotive 3737 was subsequently included in the collection of the museum.

In the 1970s, the NS 3737 engine was overhauled to be used for special rail tours. In the 1974 and '75 steam seasons, the locomotive was leased to the Stichting Stoomtrein Tilburg-Turnhout (SSTT), which operated a tourist train service on a stretch of the Tilburg - Turnhout railway line. The NS 3737 engine played an important role in the anniversary celebration of 150 years of Railways in the Netherlands in 1989. In the years that followed, the locomotive, has occasionally been active on the railway network. In 1996, she got a completely new boiler with a new firebox. The intention was to use the locomotive on a regular basis, but she broke down after a few runs. When an overhaul was needed in 2008 for the engine, the Railway Museum announced that it wanted to use part of a subsidy received from the BankGiro Lottery for this, but at the end of 2008, the amount turned out to be insufficient.

== Gallery ==
Test run with the streamlined NS 3801 engine. (1936)

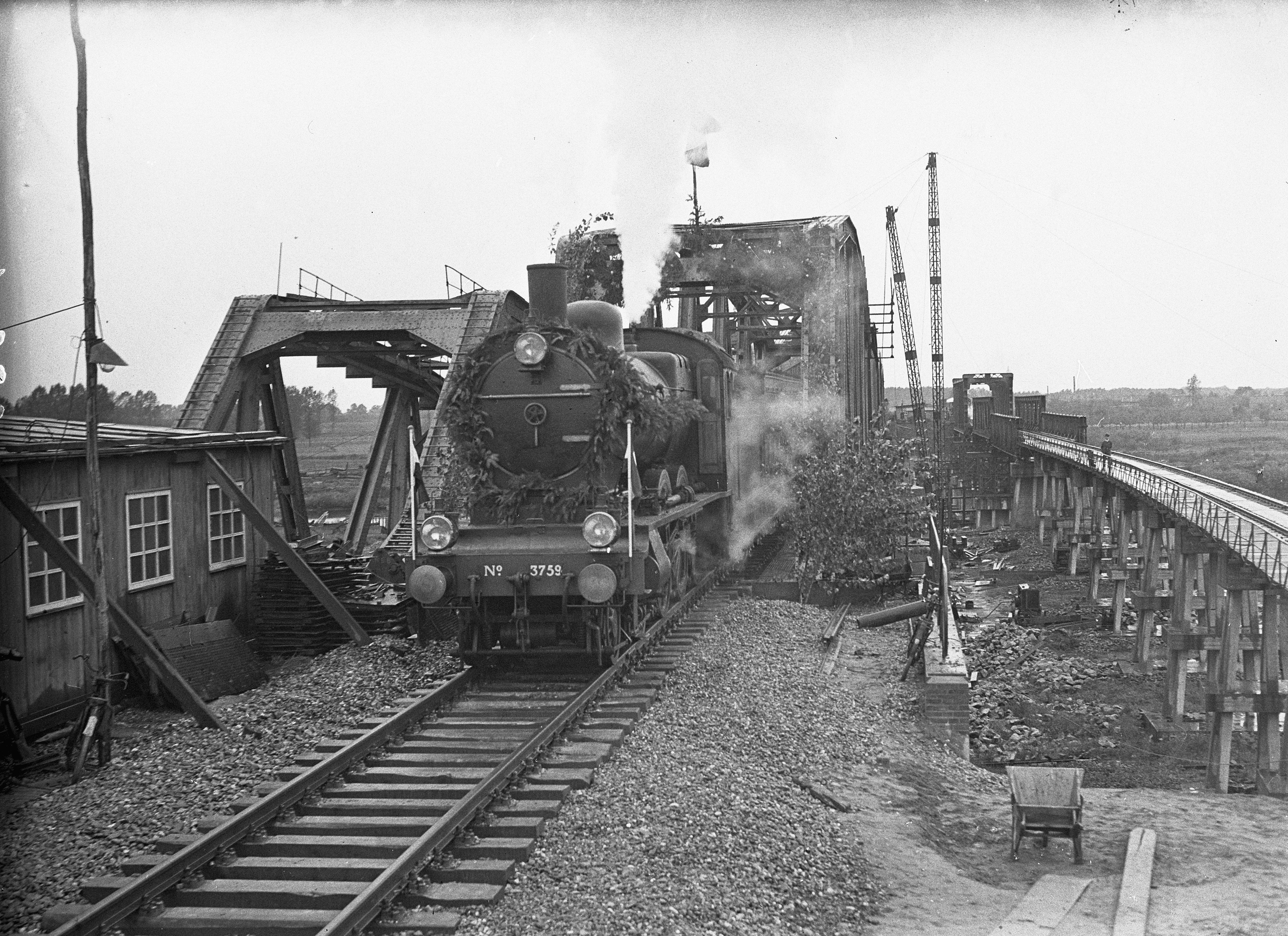
Locomotive NS 3759 at the reopening of the railway bridge in Buggenum on 29 September 1947.

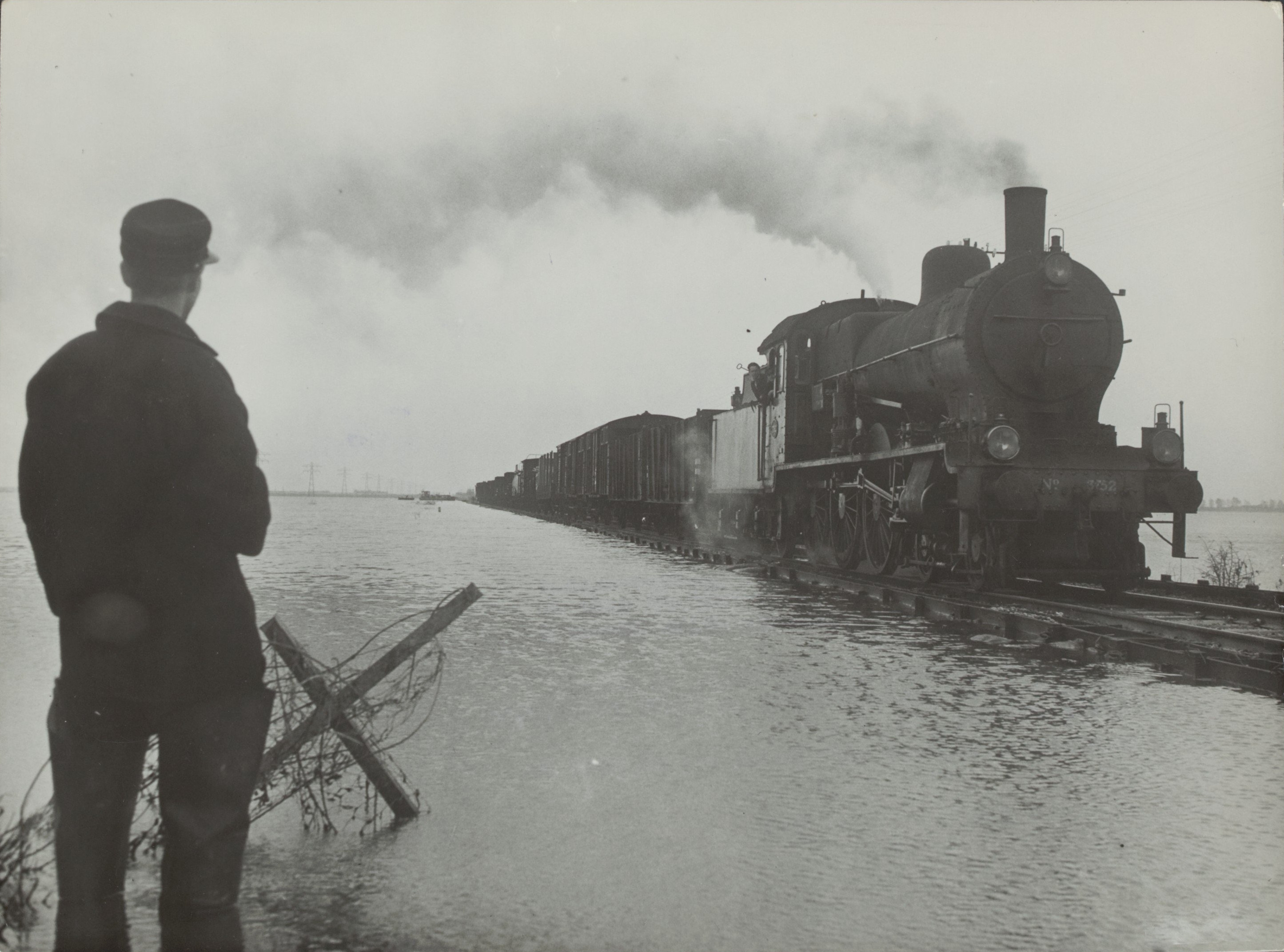
NS locomotive 3752 with freight train on the 'bathtub railway' through the Kruiningerpolder after the flood of 1953; 11 June 1953.

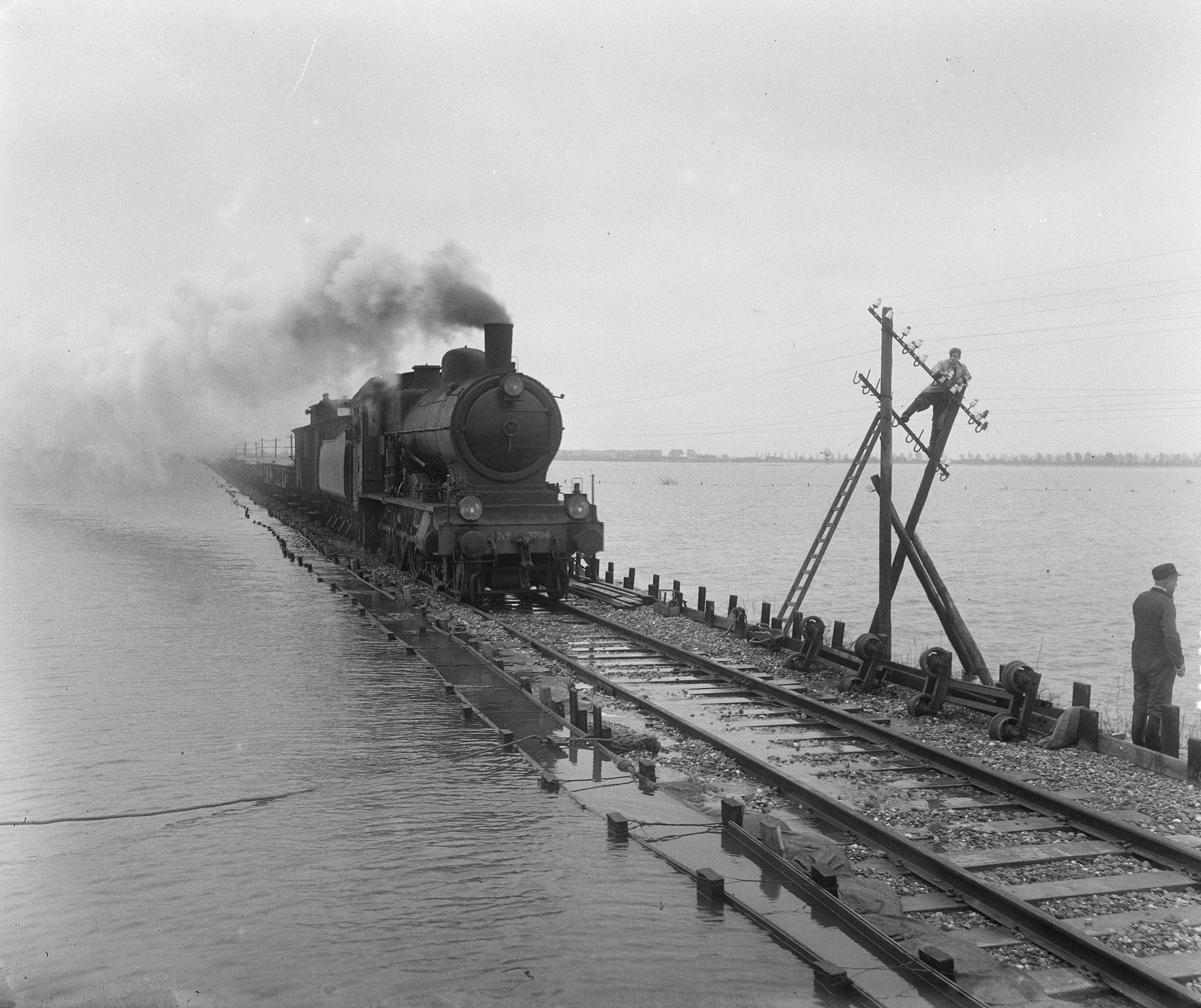
NS locomotive 3704 in the flooded Kruiningerpolder; 11 June 1953.

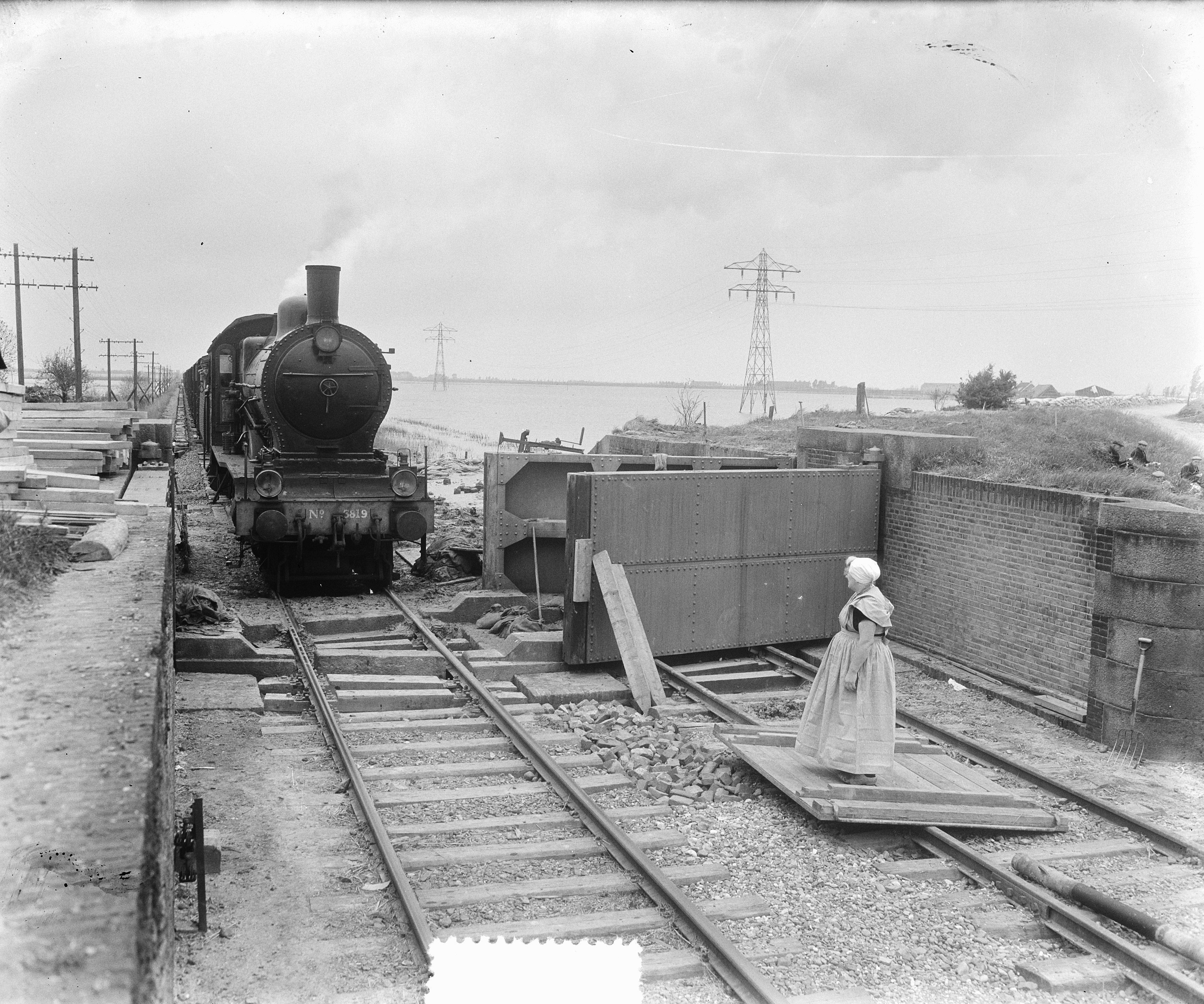
Locomotive NS 3819 at the flooded Kruiningerpolder; 11 June 1953.

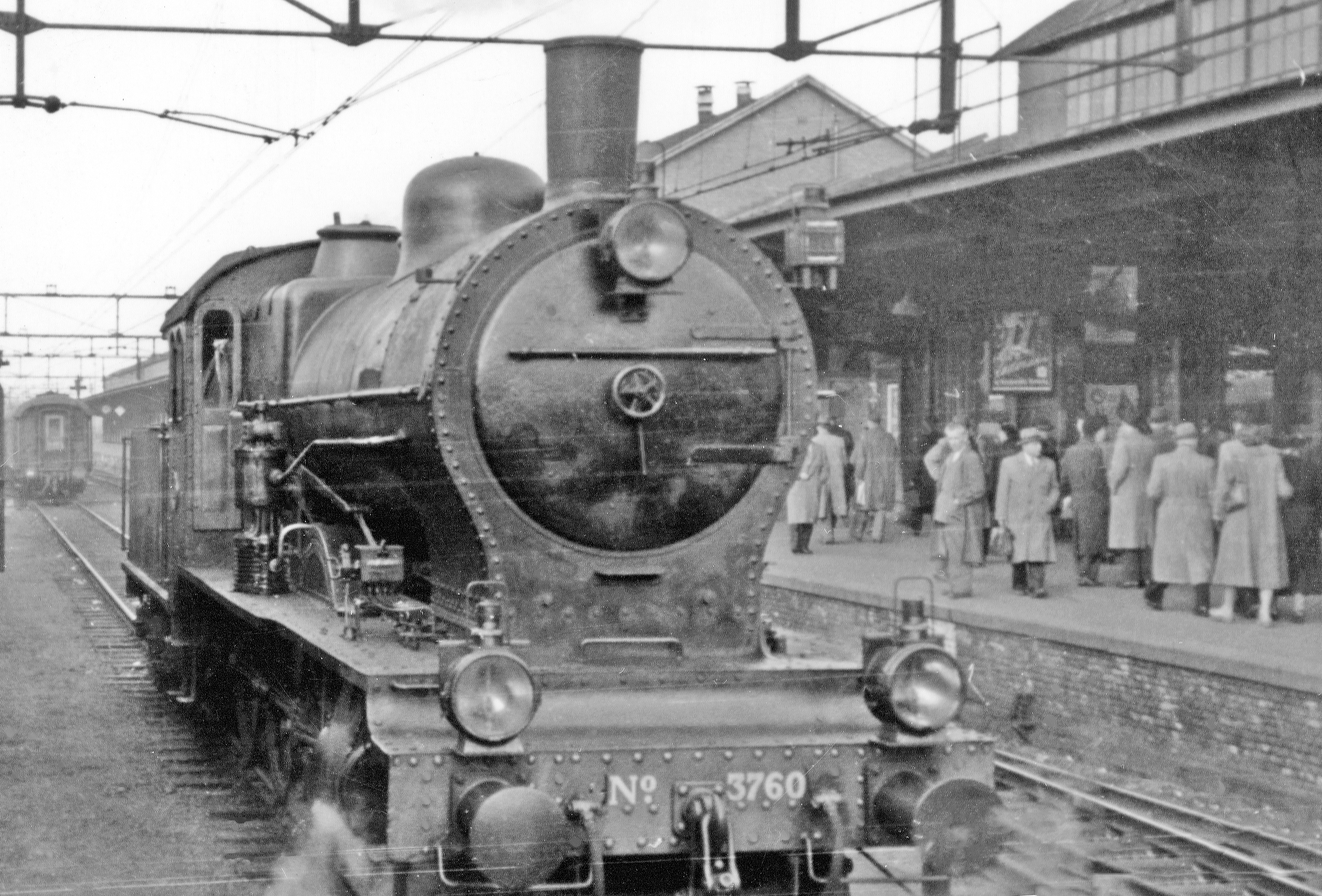
Locomotive NS 3760 in Amersfoort. (1953)

The NS 3737 engine running in preservation. (1974) (Spoken in Dutch)

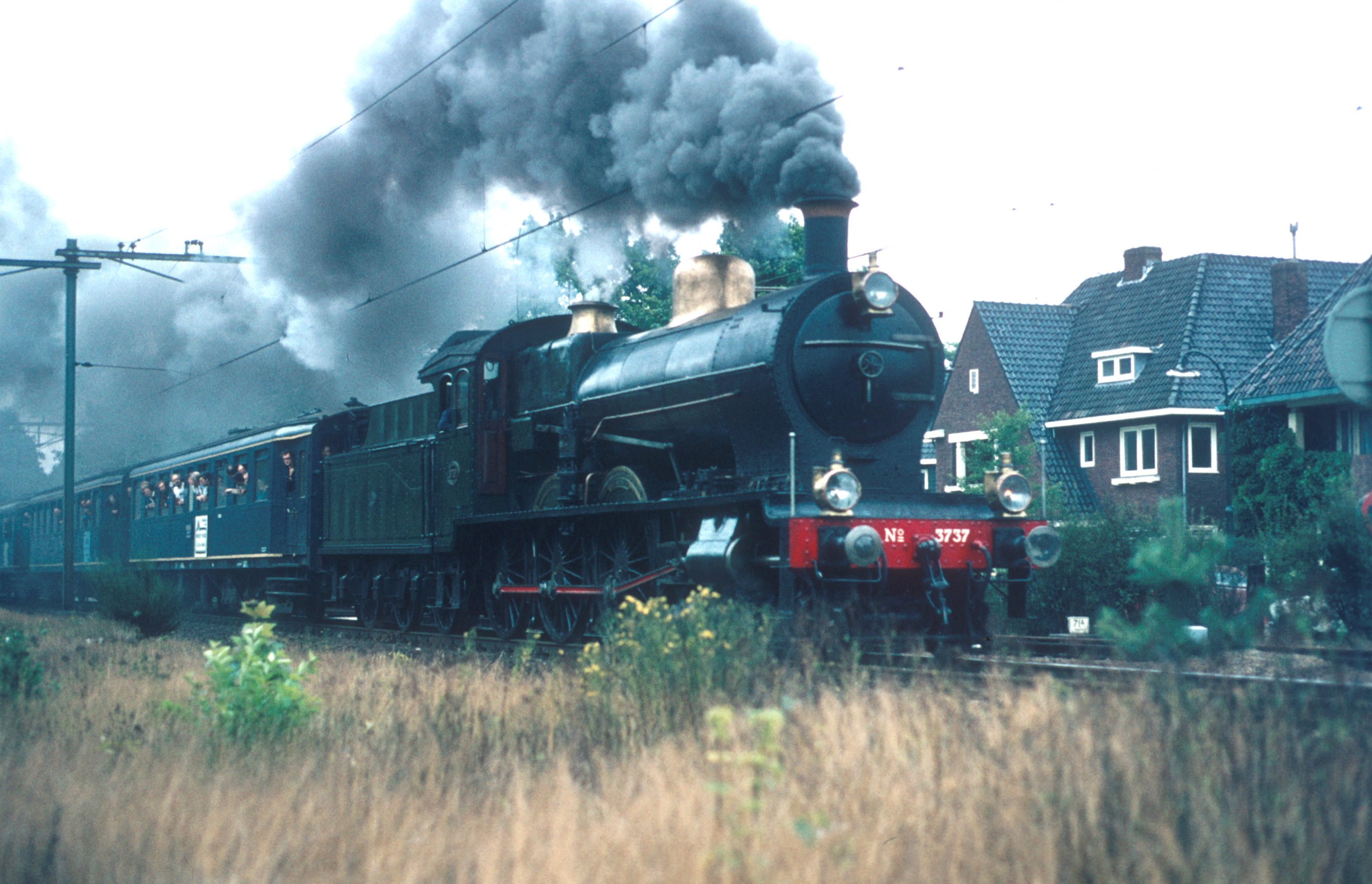
Locomotive NS 3737 engine on May 23, 1974, with an excursion train in Bilthoven.

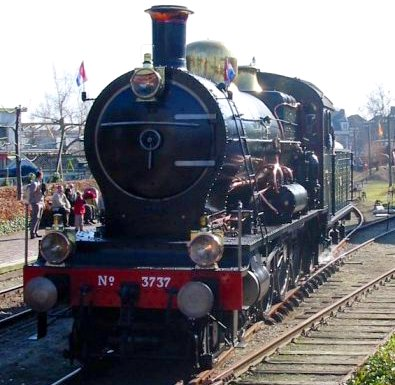
NS 3737 engine in the Spoorwegmuseum

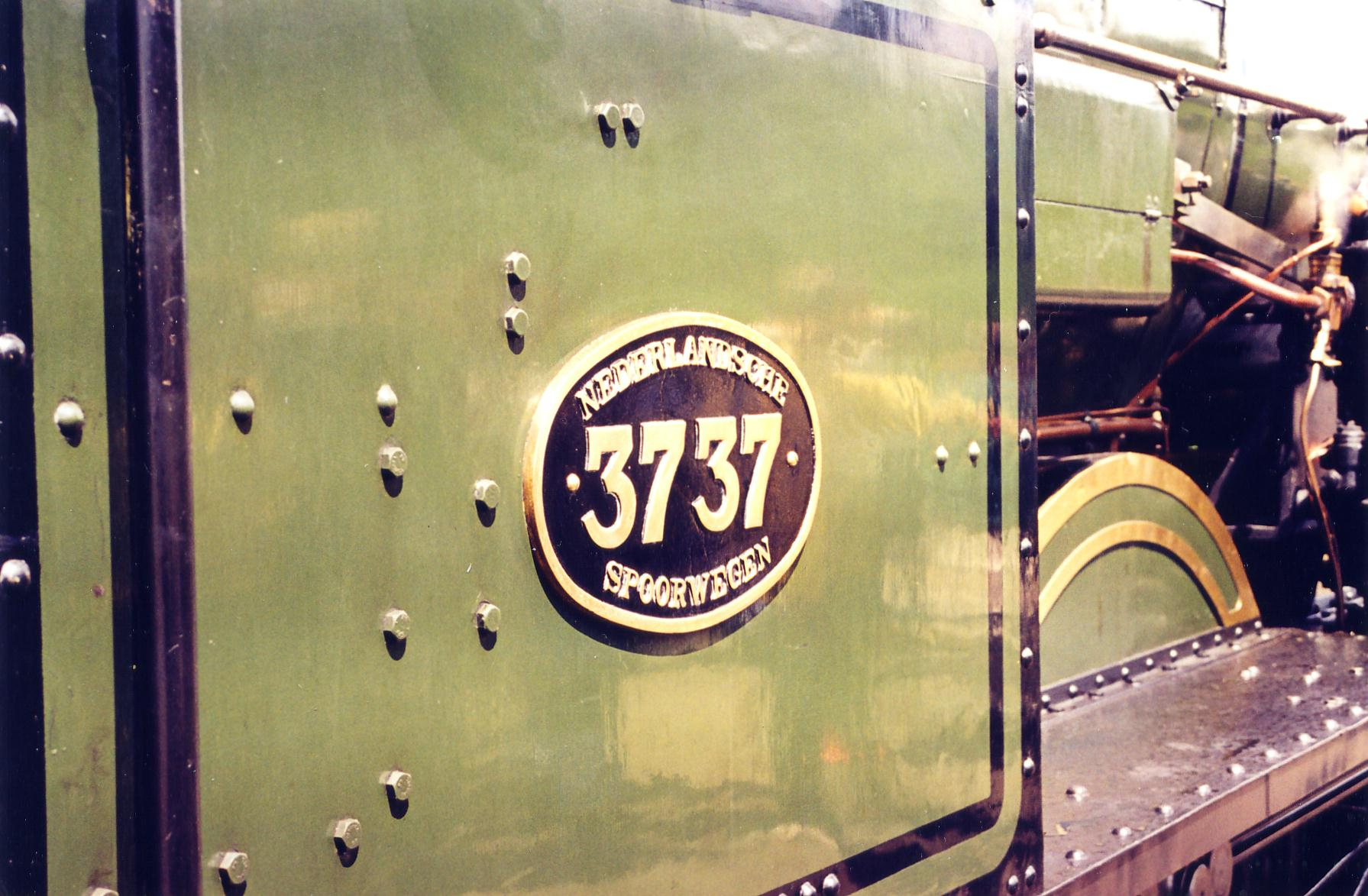
Detail of steam locomotive NS 3737.

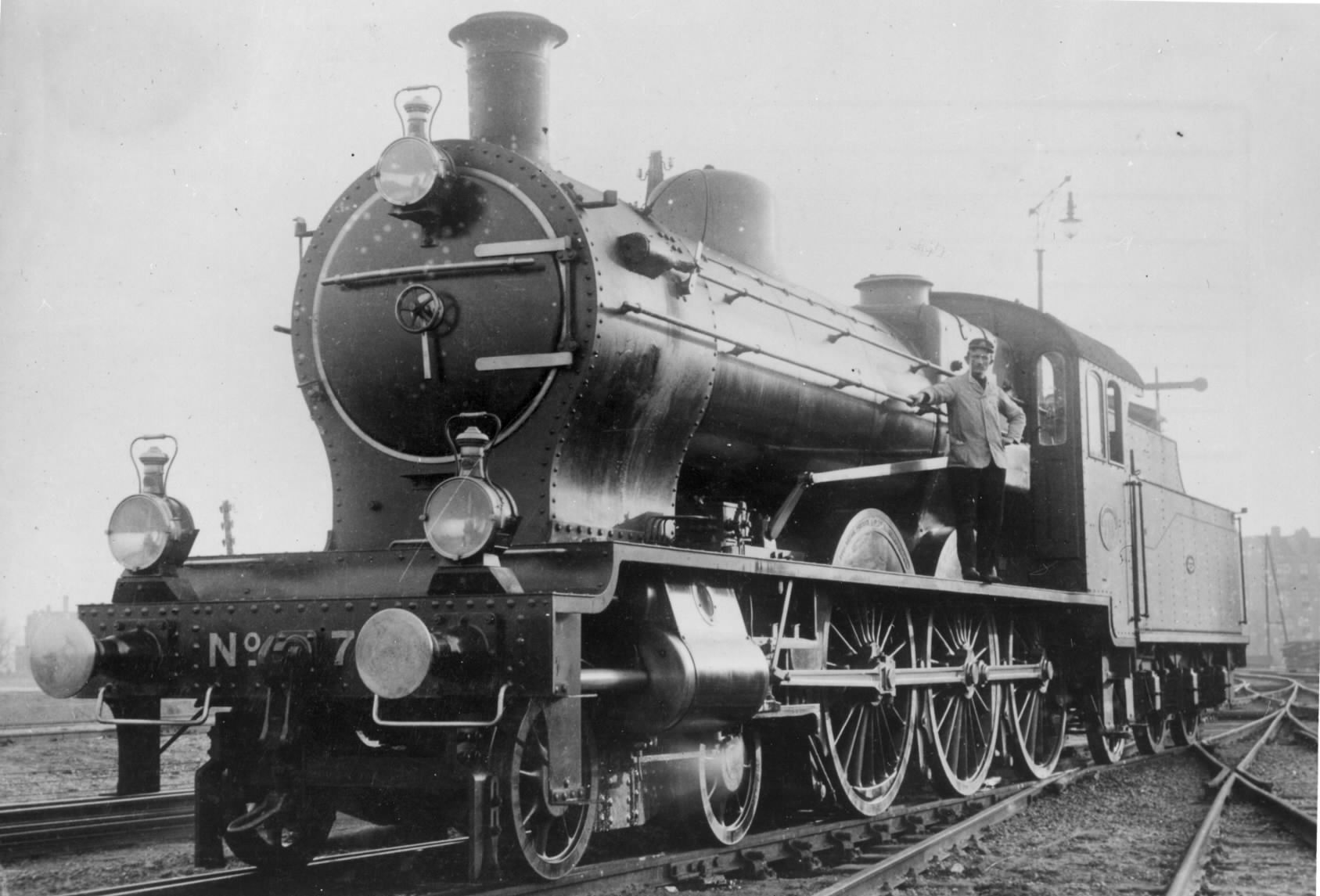
Steam locomotive no. 713 of the S.S. (State Railways) later NS 3713

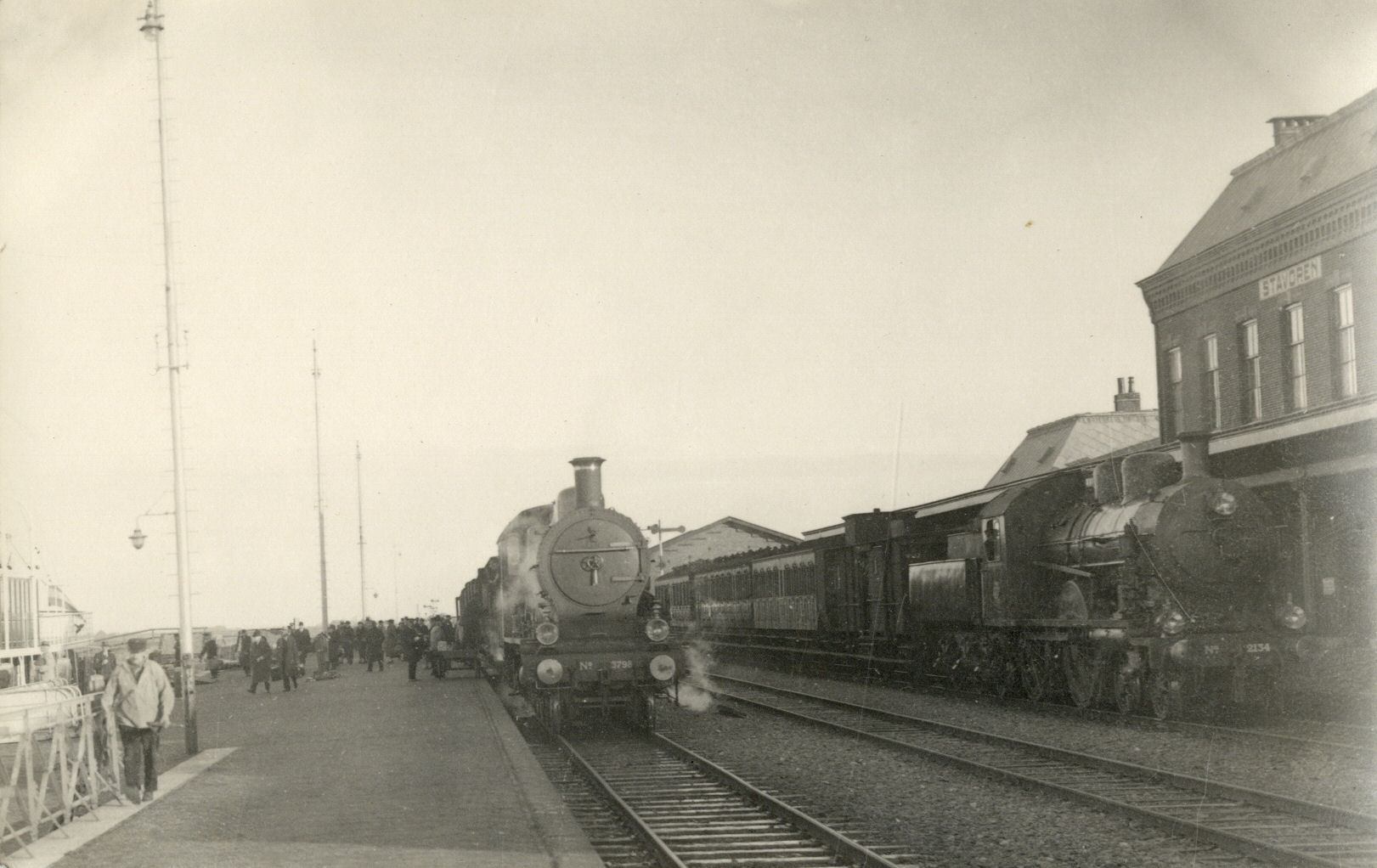
Engine NS 3798 (left) together with Engine NS 2134 (right) at Stavoren station

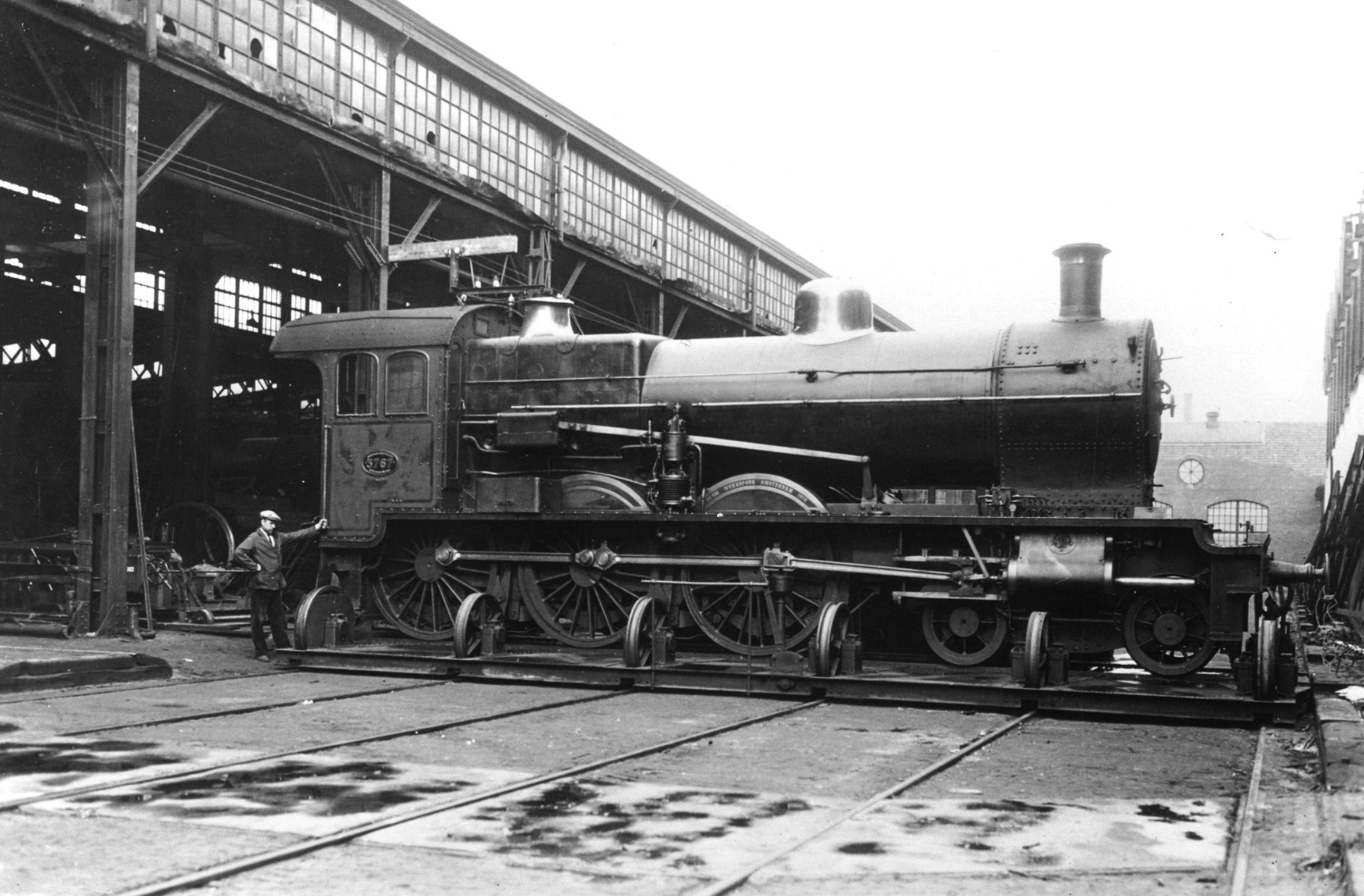
NS 3767 on the transfer table at the Central Workshop Tilburg

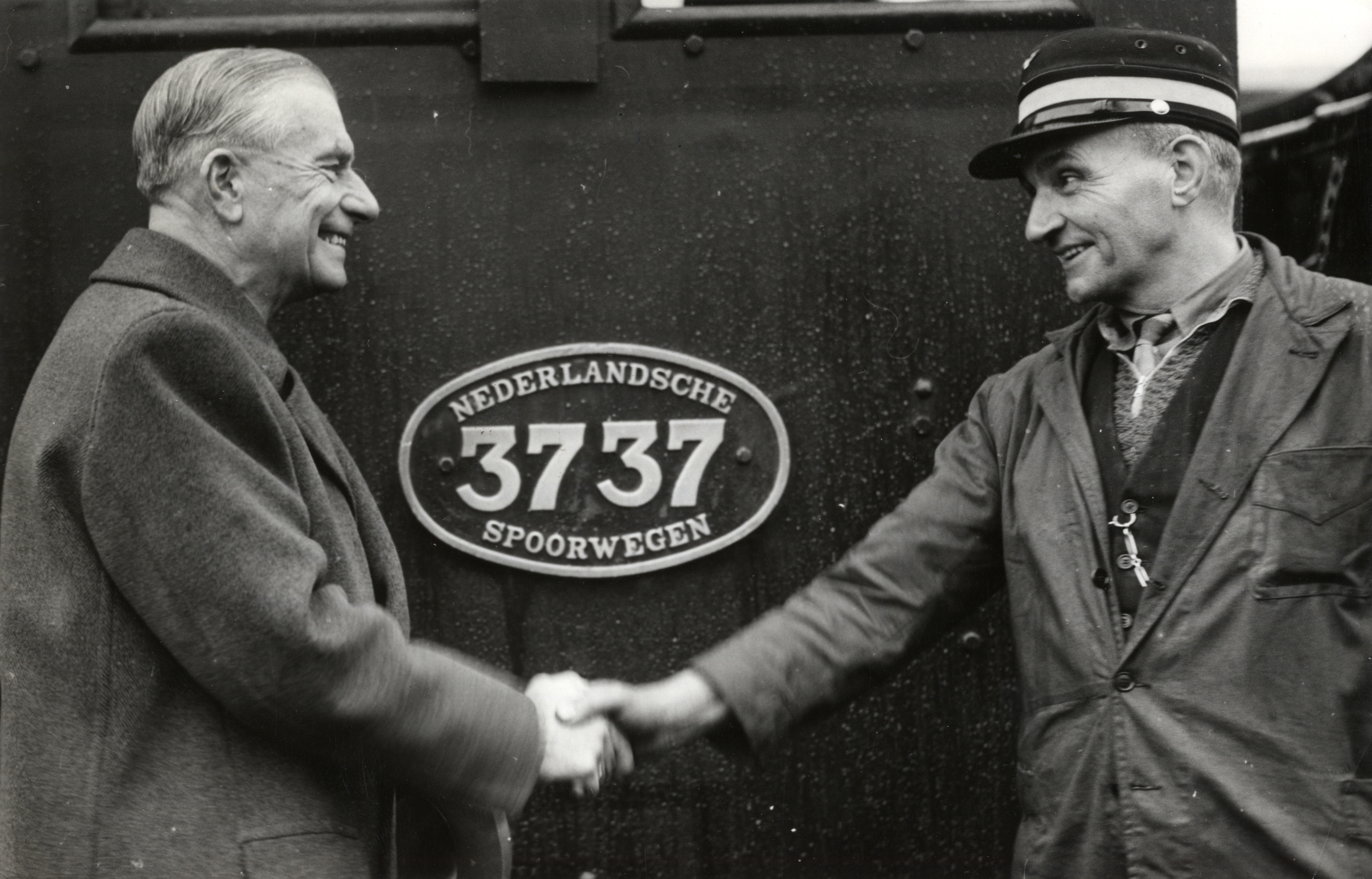
The NS 3737 engine being donated after the last official service from Geldermalsen to Utrecht Maliebaan.

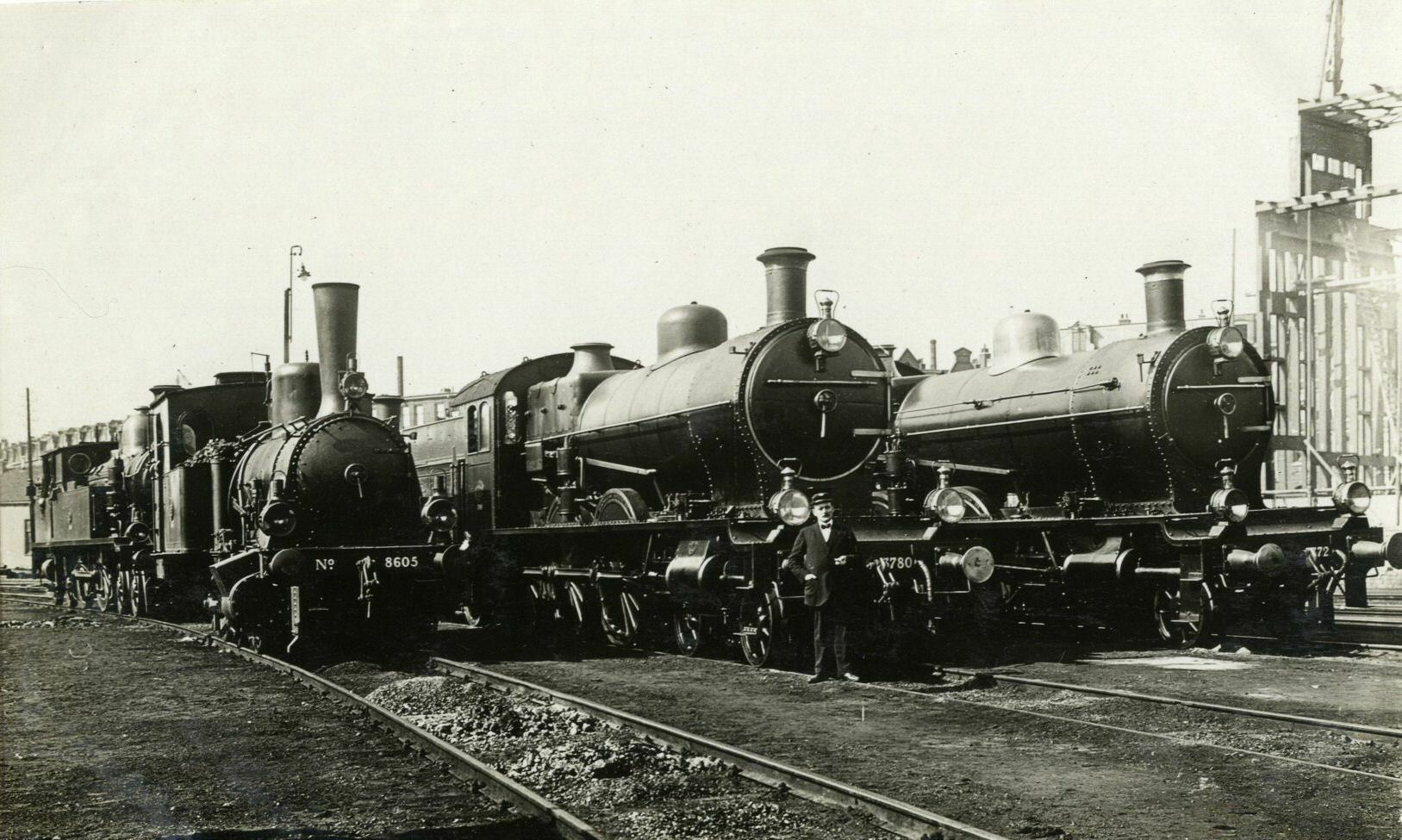
Some NS locomotives, from left to right Engine no. 8605 (series 8600), Engine no. 3780 (with a larger smokebox door) and no. 3772 (series 3700/3800)

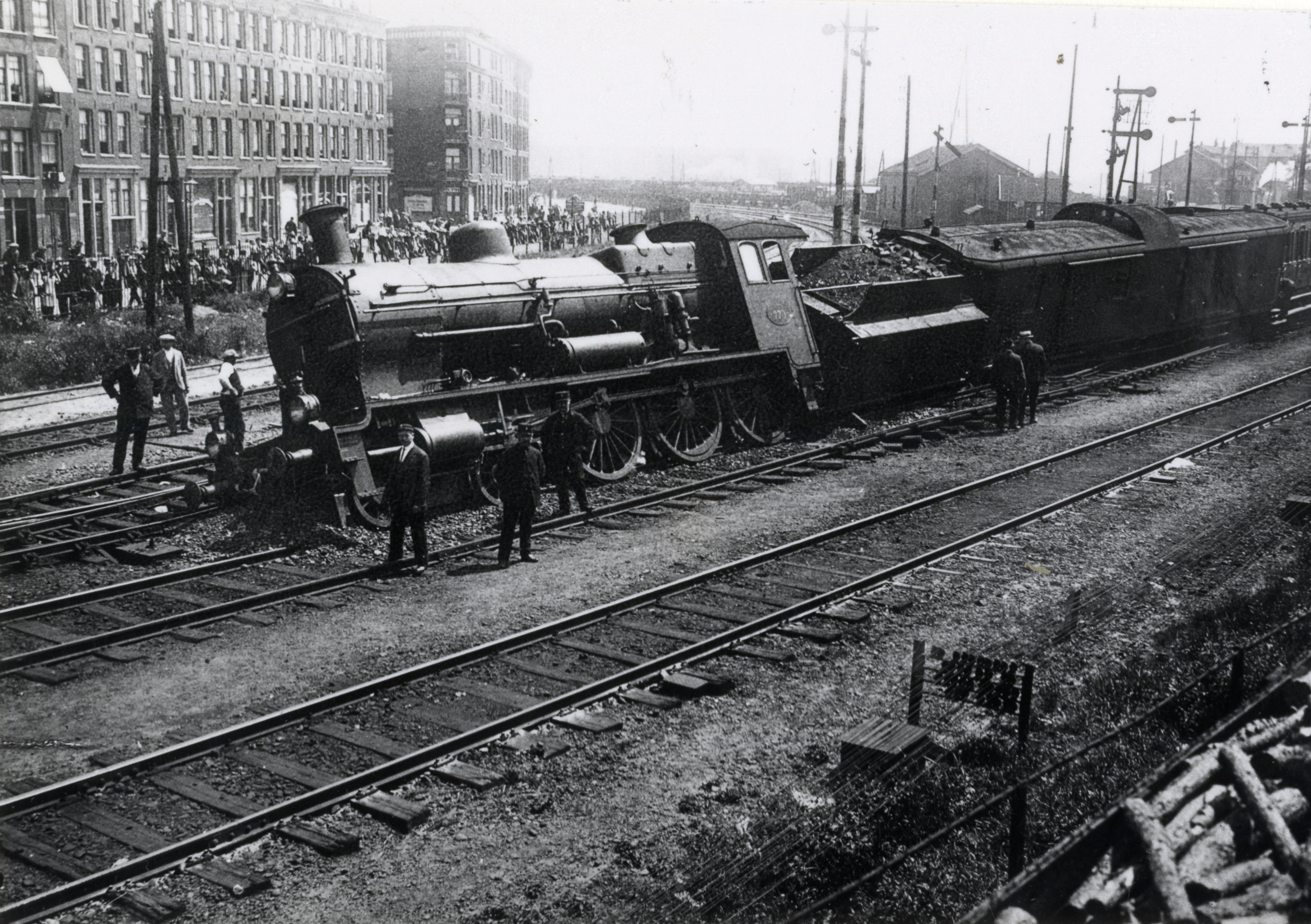
Derailed locomotive SS 770 near Amsterdam Weesperpoort

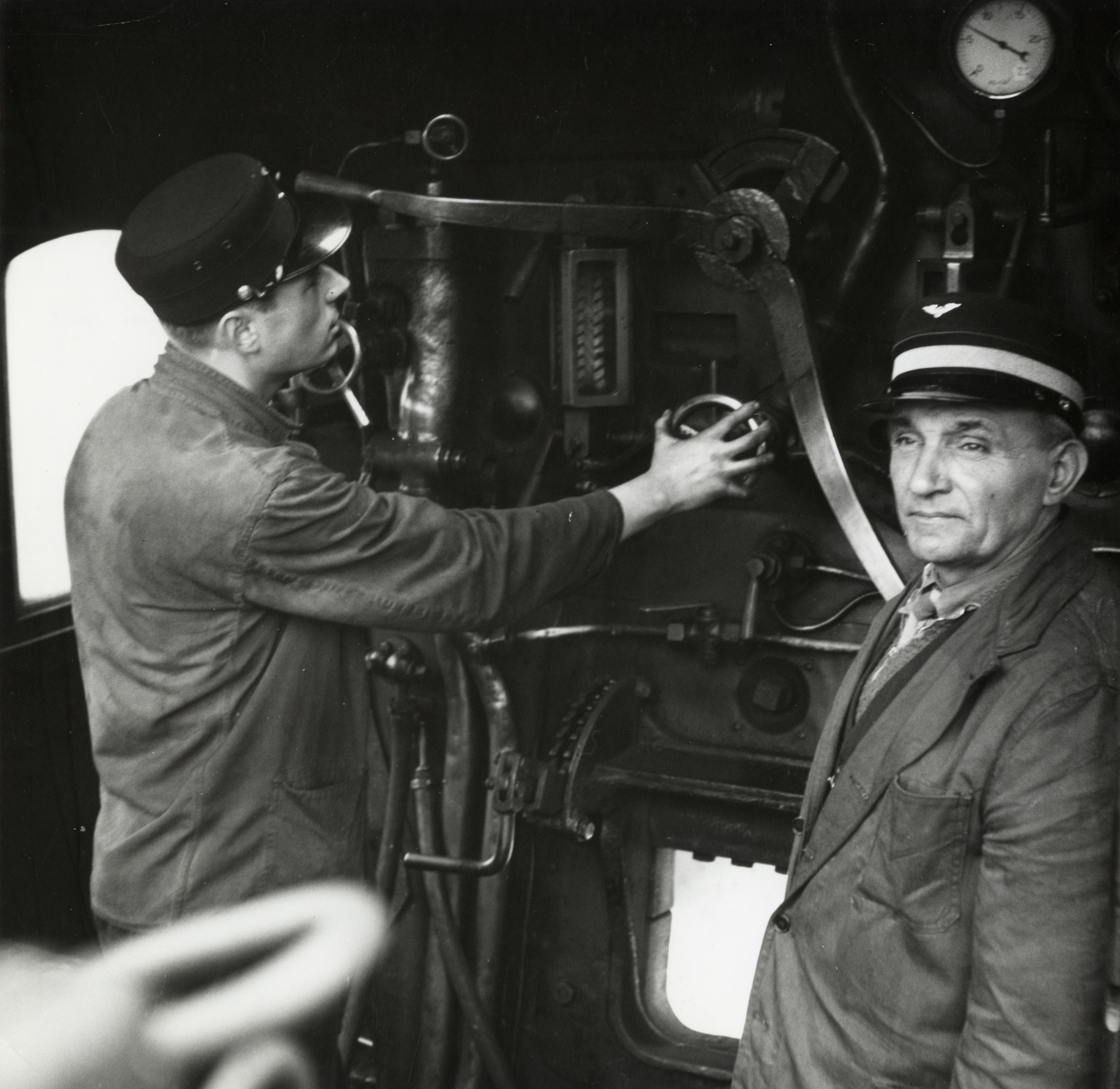
Driver H.A. van Hooij (right) and fireman P. Bos in the cab of NS 3737 engine (1958)

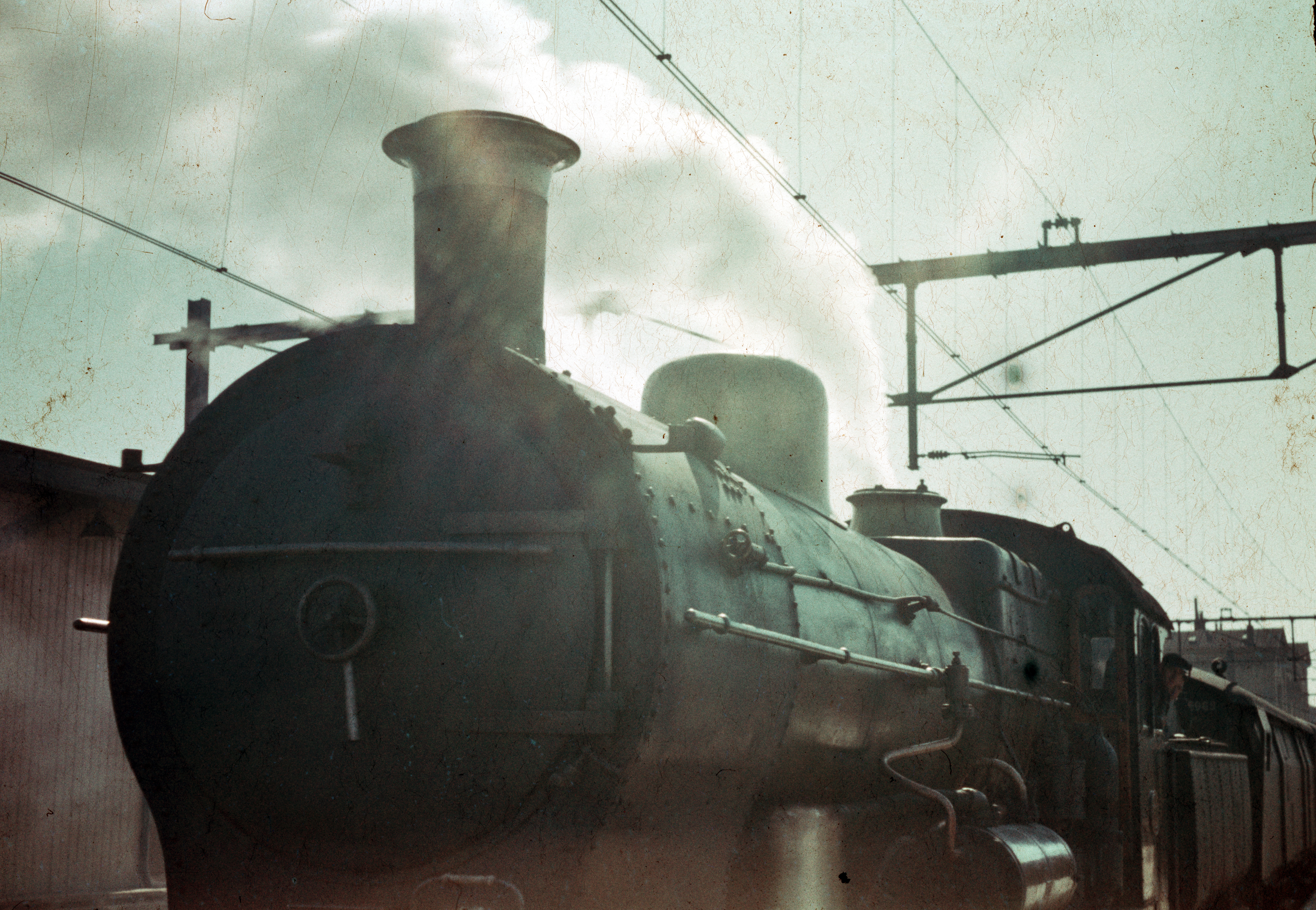
Rare color photo of an NS 3700 engine series from ca. 1940

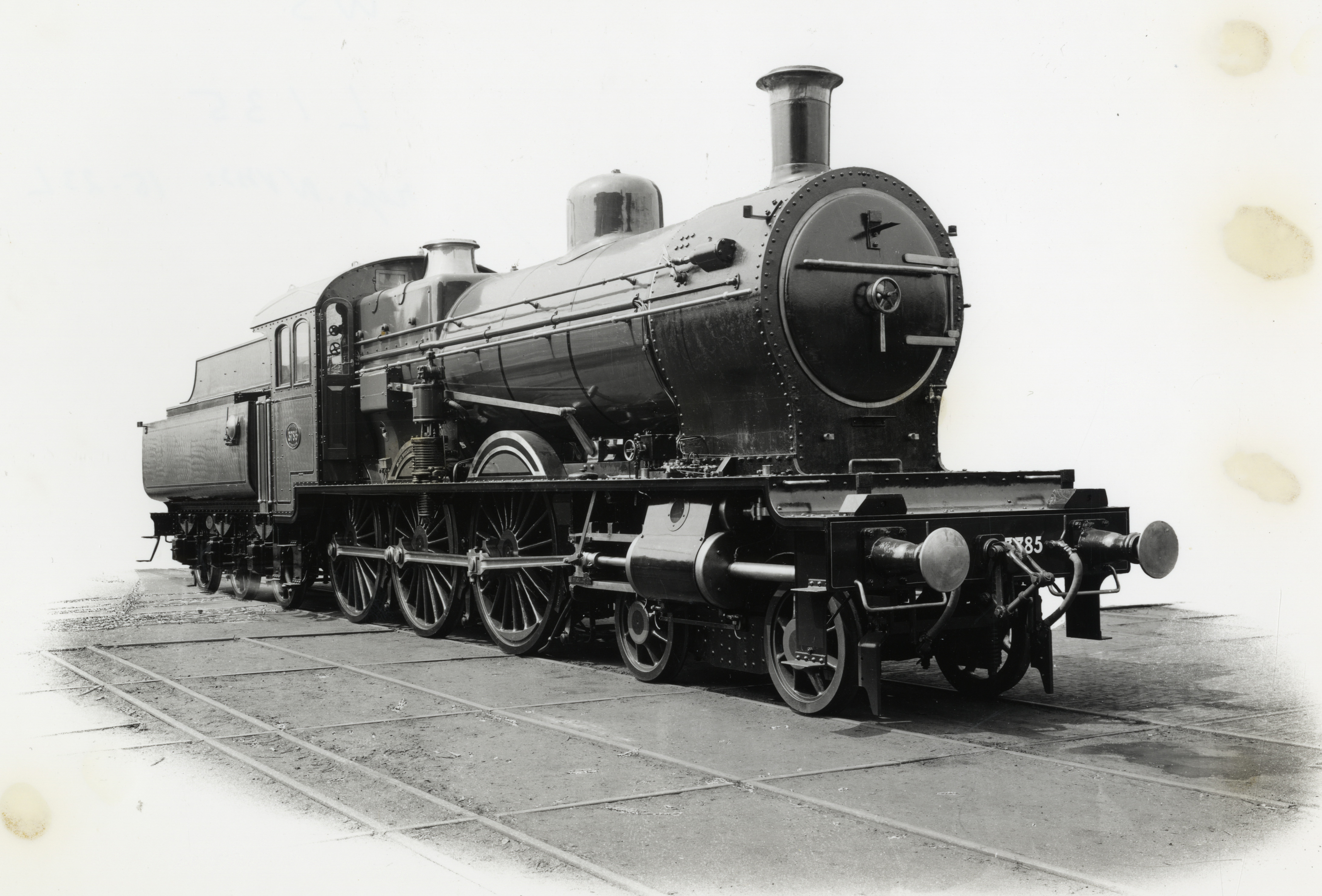
The factory new steam locomotive NS 3785 (1921)

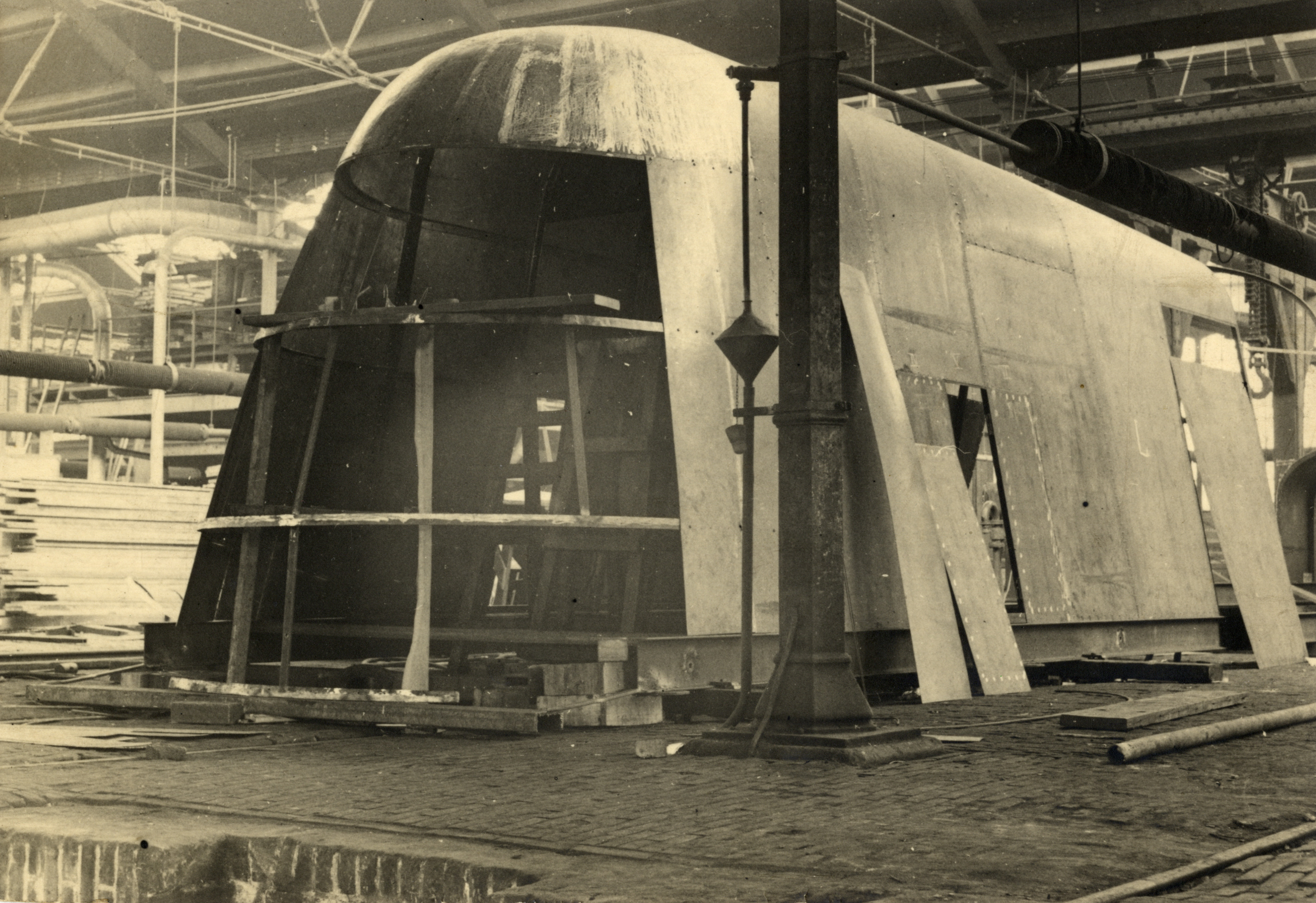
The streamline casing for NS 3804 engine (1935 - 1936)

A member of the NS 3700 engine series collided with a train (1937)

== The NS 3700 as a model ==
The NS 3700 class engine was released by some Dutch model train manufacturers in scales H0 and 0, first as an expensive handmade brass model by Philotrain and since 2010 as a cheaper production model in H0 scale by Artitec. This has marketed virtually all variants of from the SS engine and NS engine in all analogue and digital power types. Some adjustments had to be made because the curves in the model are much tighter than in reality.

== Sources ==
- Paul Henken: Stoomlocomotieven Serie SS 685-799 (NS 3700). De geschiedenis van de Jumbo's. Uquilair, Rosmalen, 2001. ISBN 90-71513-38-6
- Paul Henken: Stoomlocomotieven NS-serie 6100. De geschiedenis van de Tenderjumbo's. Uquilair, Rosmalen, 2002. ISBN 90-71513-43-2
- R.C. Statius Muller, A.J. Veenendaal jr., H. Waldorp: De Nederlandse stoomlocomotieven. De Alk, Alkmaar, 2005. ISBN 90-6013-262-9
- Het Utrechts Archief
