= NS 6100 =

Class of 2'C2' Dutch steam locomotives

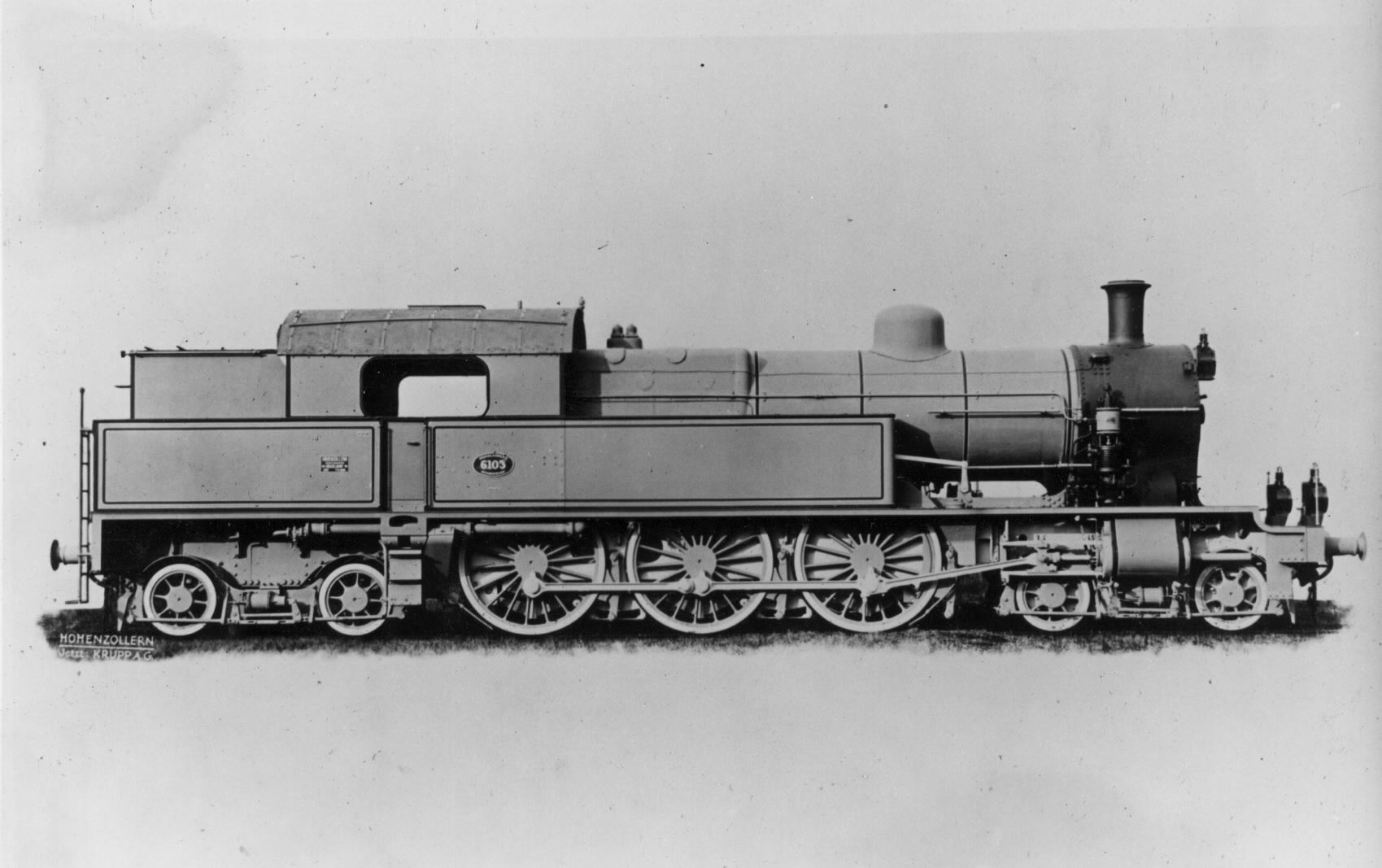
Type and origin
- Power type: Steam
- Builder: Hohenzollern, Werkspoor
- Build date: 1929
- Total produced: 10
Specifications
- Configuration
  - Whyte: 4-6-4T
  - UIC: 2'C2'
- Gauge: 1,435 mm (4 ft 8 1/2 in)
- Leading dia.: 930 mm (3 ft 1 in)
- Driver dia.: 1,850 mm (6 ft 1 in)
- Length: 16,300 mm (53 ft 6 in)
- Width: 2,820 mm (9 ft 3 in)
- Height: 4,530 mm (14 ft 10 in)
- Loco weight: 108 t (119 short tons; 106 long tons)
- Fuel type: Coal
- Fuel capacity: 4.3 t (4.7 short tons; 4.2 long tons)
- Water cap.: 12 m^{3} (2,600 imp gal)
- Firebox
  - Type: Belpaire
  - Grate area: 15.4 m^{2} (166 sq ft)
- Heating surface
  - Firebox: 2.84 m^{2} (30.6 sq ft)
  - Tubes: 130 m^{2} (1,400 sq ft)
- Superheater
  - Heating area: 43.2 m^{2} (465 sq ft)
- Cylinders: 4
- Cylinder size: 420 mm × 660 mm (17 in × 26 in)
- Valve gear: Walschaerts
Performance figures
- Maximum speed: 90 km/h (56 mph)
- Tractive effort: 10,550 kgf (23,300 lbf)
Career
- Operators: NS
- Power class: PTO^{4}
- Numbers: 6101-6110
- Withdrawn: 1945 - 1958
- Disposition: All scrapped

The NS 6100 was a series of tank engines with the 2'C2' (4-6-4) wheel arrangement of the Dutch Railways (NS). They were manufactured by Hohenzollern and Werkspoor.

== History ==
In the 1920s, the Dutch Railways invested heavily in the reinforcement of the railway track, as a result of which the maximum permitted axle load on most main lines could be increased from 16 to 18 tons. This created for the first time the possibility of designing a 2'C2' tank engine, which was completely derived from the 1910-originating four-cylinder series NS 3700. Until then, lighter two-cylinder locomotives of the series NS 6000 with a maximum axle load of 15.4 tons represented the limited possibility for a Dutch tank engine.

The first five locomotives were built by Hohenzollern in 1929 and five more were built by Werkspoor later that year.

Builder	Lot No.	Entered service	NS number	Notes
Hohenzollern	4664	06-02-1929	6101	Found after the war in Emmerich
Hohenzollern	4665	23-02-1929	6102	Found after the war in Buchholz
Hohenzollern	4666	05-03-1929	6103	Destroyed by a direct hit during the war
Hohenzollern	4667	02-03-1929	6104	Found after the war in Oldenburg
Hohenzollern	4668	19-03-1929	6105	Missing after the war
Werkspoor	586 / 2438	28-09-1929	6106	Found after the war in Emmerich
Werkspoor	587 / 2439	04-10-1929	6107	Found in Uelzen after the war
Werkspoor	588 / 2440	15-10-1929	6108	
Werkspoor	589 / 2441	25-10-1929	6109	Found in Barsinghausen after the war
Werkspoor	590 / 2442	12-11-1929	6110	

== Withdrawal and scrapping ==
No. 6103 also belonged to the first nineteen locomotives that had to be scrapped after the liberation as a result of war damage. On September 29, 1945, permission was obtained to scrap this heavily damaged locomotive, among other things. According to information from Mr. Van Wijck Jurriaanse, the scrapping (without boiler) took place in April 1946 on the site of the Wpc Tilburg, but given the inconvenient condition of 6103, it seems more likely that the locomotive has come to its final end in Arnhem. The second 6100 to be scrapped was locomotive 6109, which had returned from Barsinghausen, Germany, damaged.

In 1956 the systematic withdrawal of the remaining seven 6100s was initiated. First up were Nos. 6101 (March) and 6106 (May), of which No. 6106 was allocated to the Zutphen depot from 19 May to 30 September 1956 as a stationary boiler. During 1957 Nos. 6104 (February), 6107 and 6110 (both August) were withdrawn and put aside for scrap, and in February 1958 the last Tenderjumbos 6102 and 6108 were also withdrawn from service.

Withdrawal of locomotives
Ns number	Boiler No. from locomotive	Date permission for scrapping	Date sold	Name of company and place
3791	6104	29-04-1957	18-07-1957	Siemens, Rotterdam (However, scrapped at Van Dijk, Veenendaal)
6101	6109	23-03-1956	21-06-1956	Sideron, Berkel
6102	6105	27-02-1958	07-03-1958	Hollandia, Amsterdam
6103	-	29-09-1945	04-1946	Wpc Tilburg
6104	3730	18-02-1957	30-09-1957	Dotermont, Maastricht
6105	4611	03-02-1950	Missing DRB	Unknown
6106	6101	31-05-1956	29-11-1956	Rijsdijk, Hedrik Ido Ambacht
6107	6102	16-08-1957	30-09-1957	Dotremont, Maastracht
6108	6107	27-02-1958	07-03-1958	Siemens, Rotterdam (However, scrapped at Van Dijk, Veenendaal)
6109	-	01-05-1947	08-1947	Simons, Rotterdam
6110	6110	16-08-1957	30-09-1957	Ver. Utrechtse IJzerhandel

Scrapping of boilers
Boiler No. from locomotive	Date permission given for scrapping	Date of sale	Name of company and place
6103	29-05-1947	21-07-1947	De boer & Slooten, Purmerend
6106	26-03-1954	07-04-1954	Visch, Harderwijk
6108	24-03-1953	ca. 04-1953	Unknown

== Gallery ==
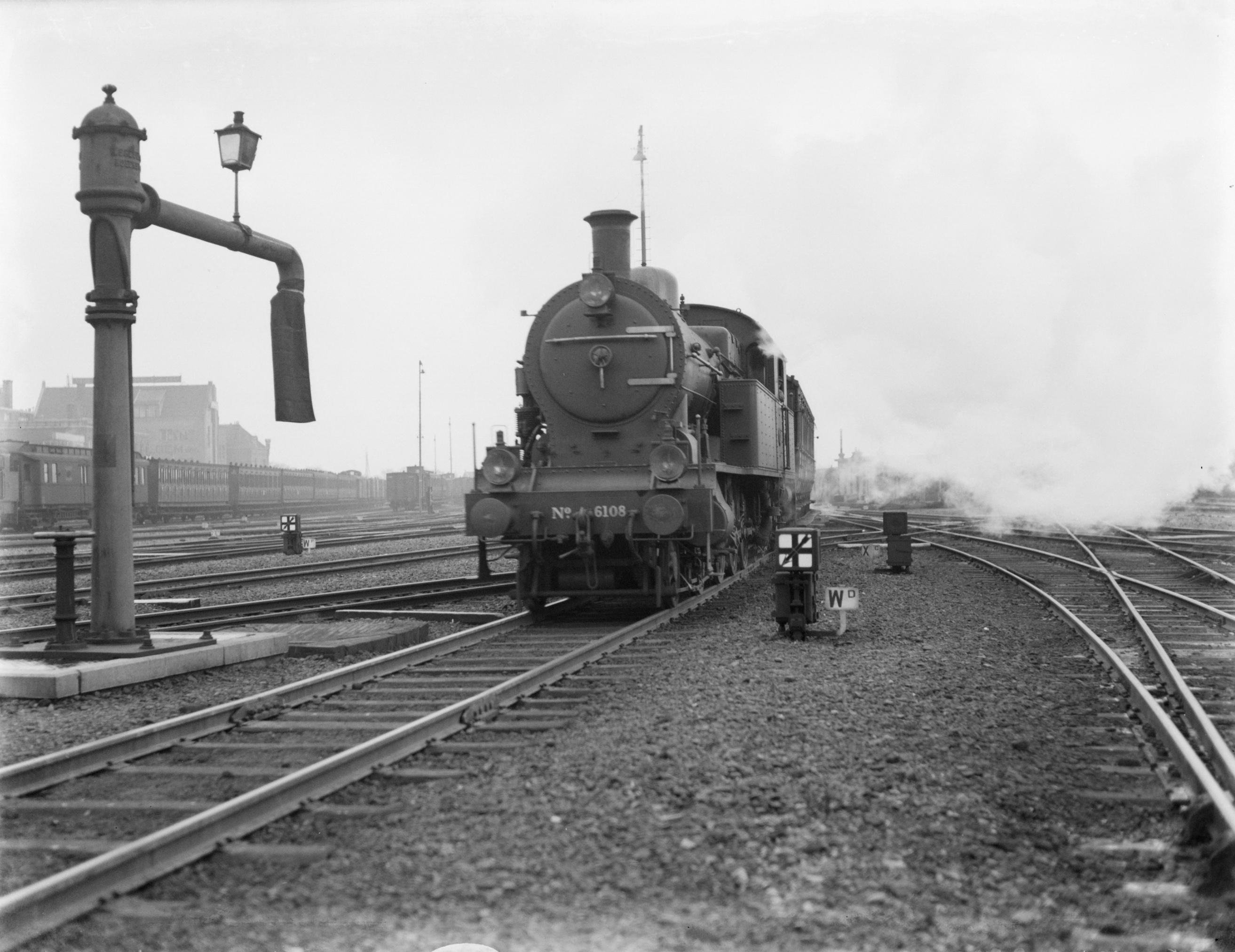
NS 6108 at the water column

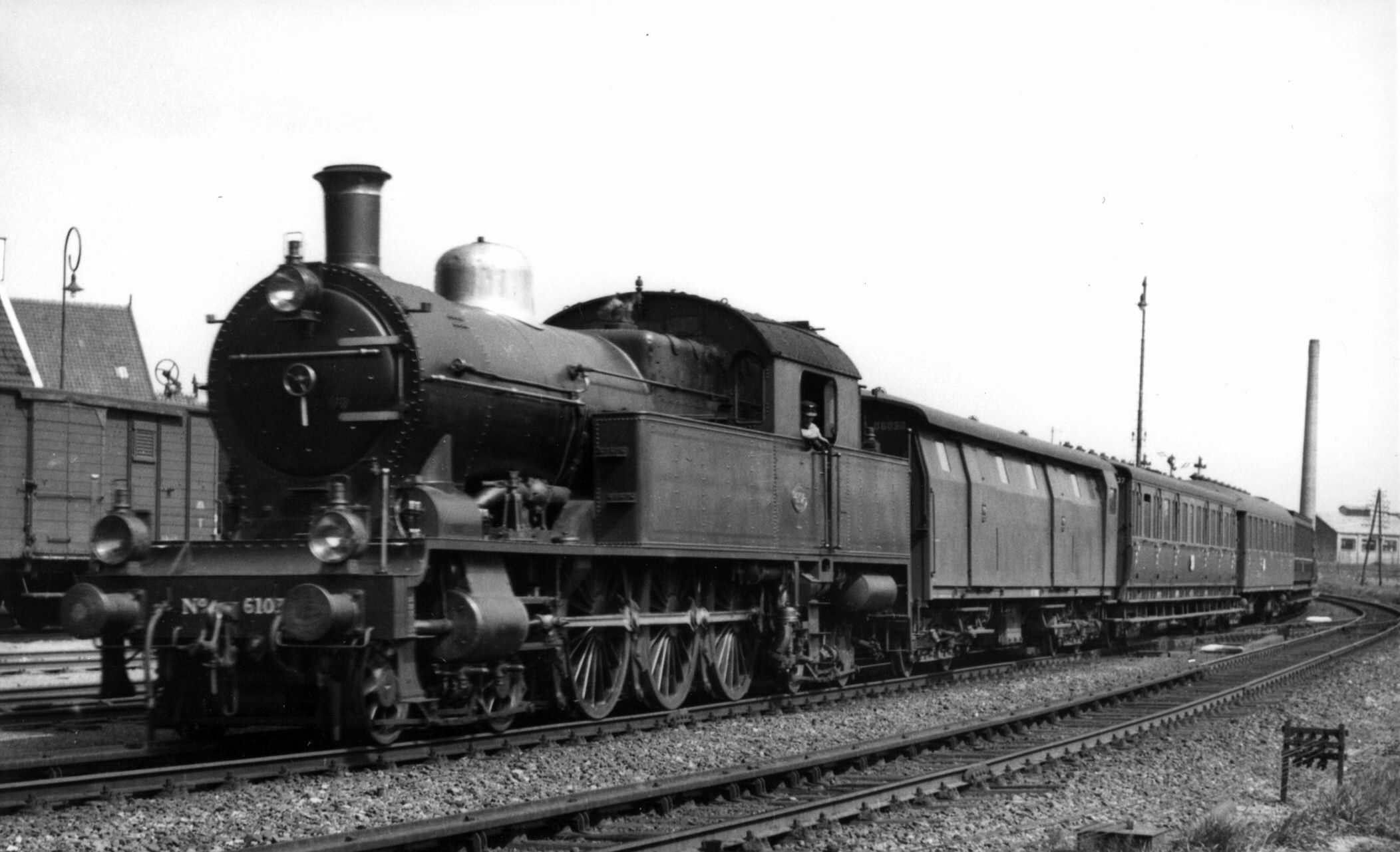
NS 6107 with a train near Hilversum. (July 1935)

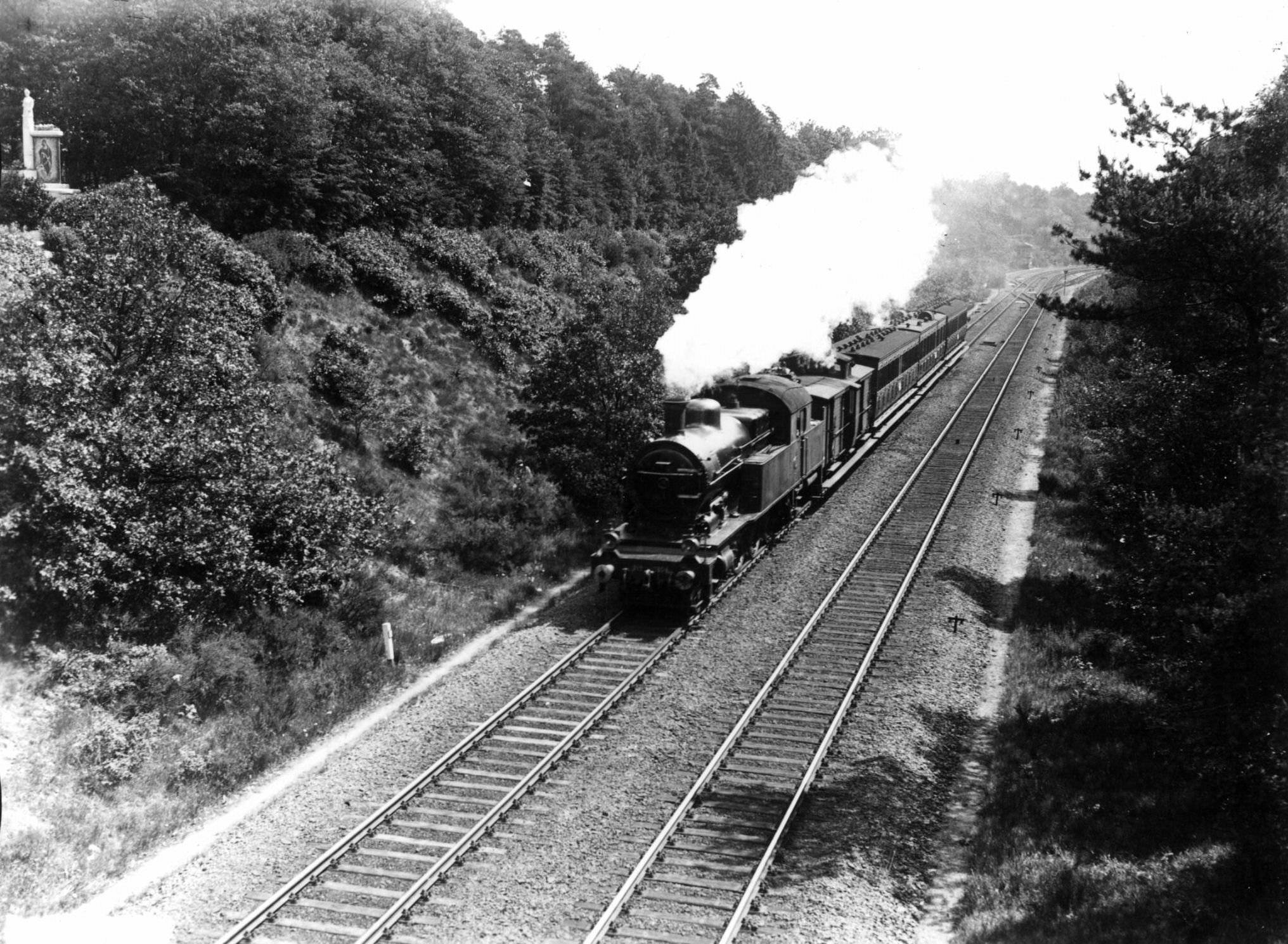
NS 6104 with a passenger train at Baarn. (10-06-1938)

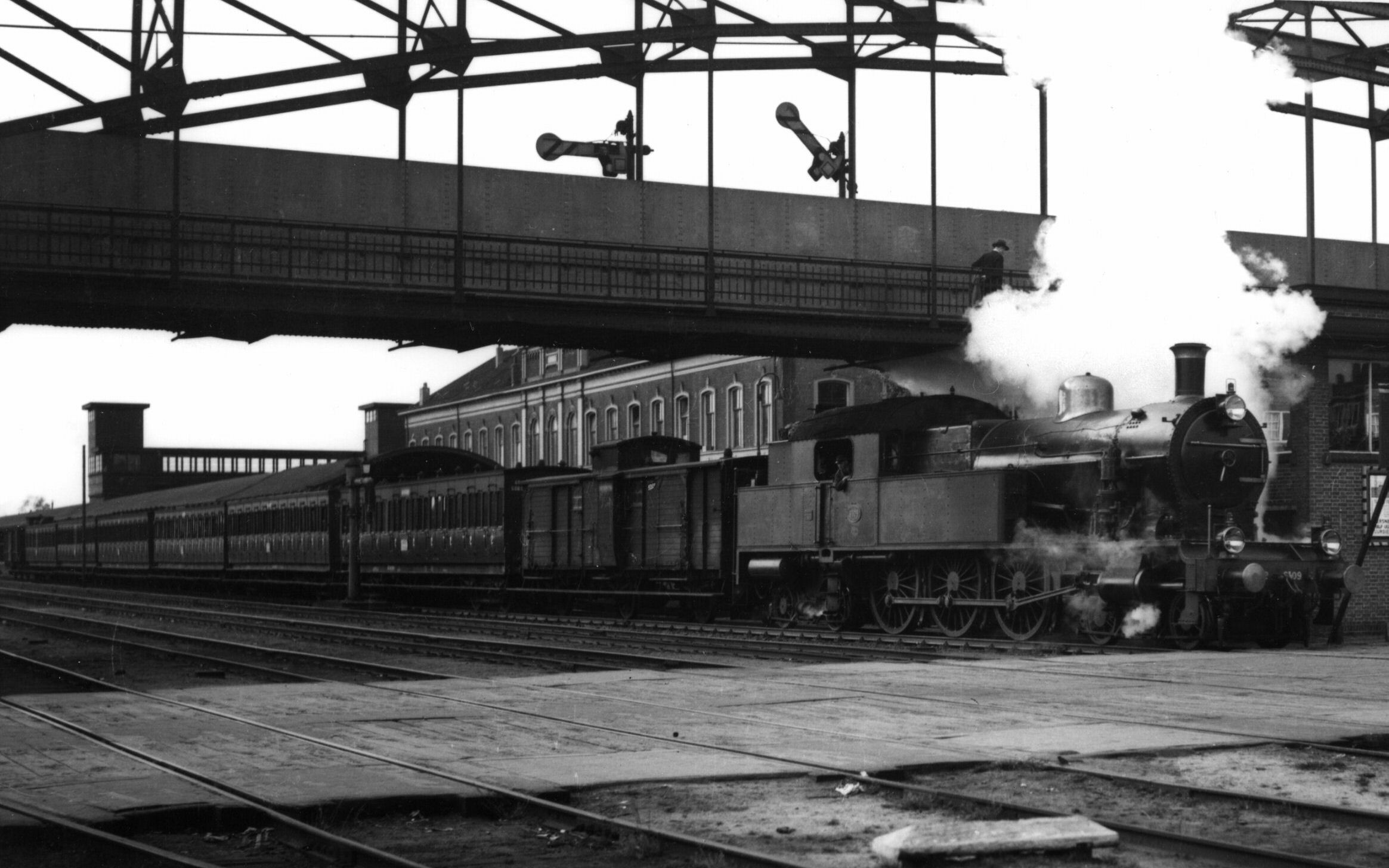
NS 6109 with a train at Hilversum station (July 1935)

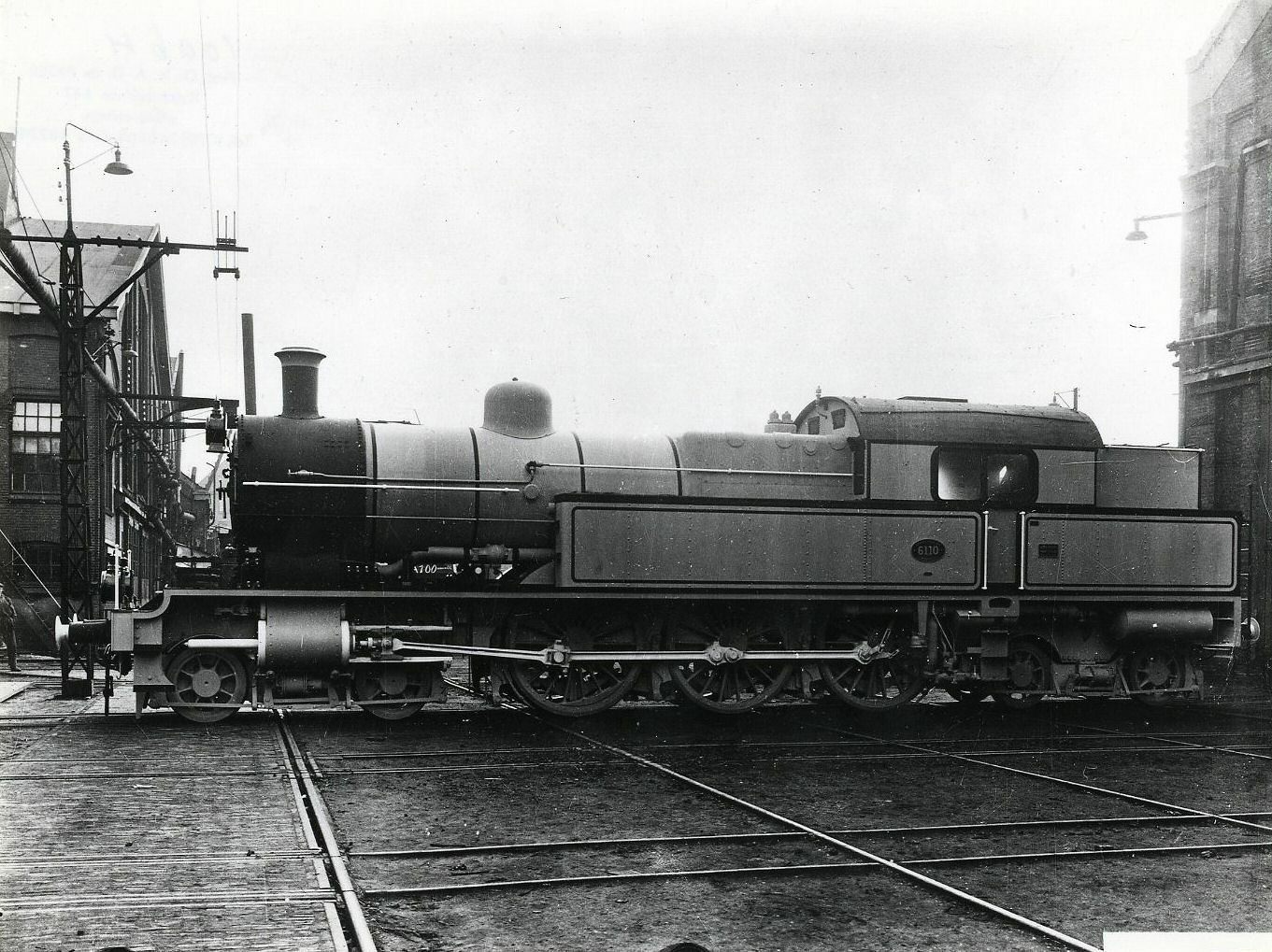
NS 6110 on the factory site of Werkspoor N.V. in Amsterdam. (12-11-1929)

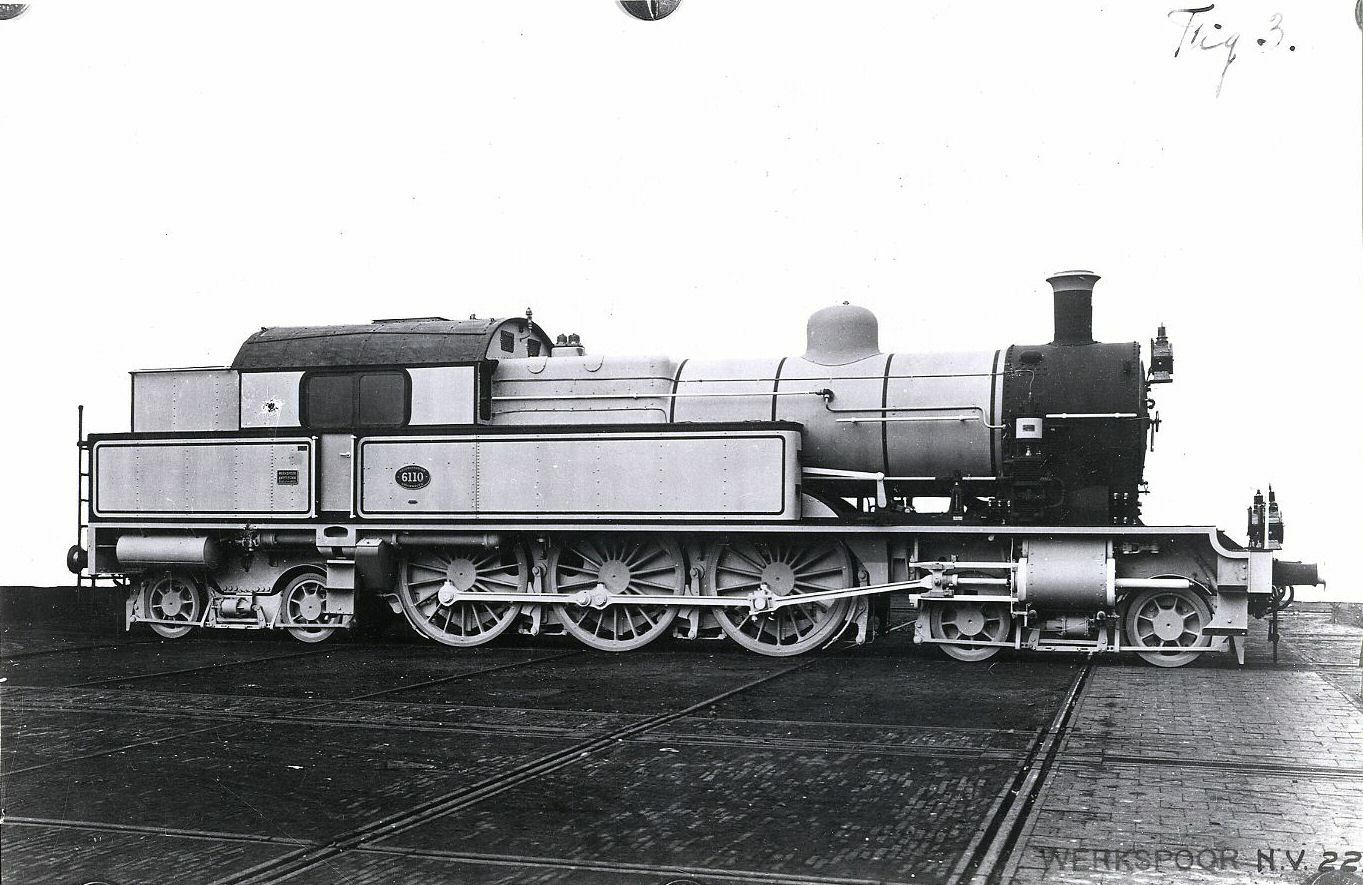
NS 6110 on the factory site of Werkspoor N.V. in Amsterdam. (12-11-1929)

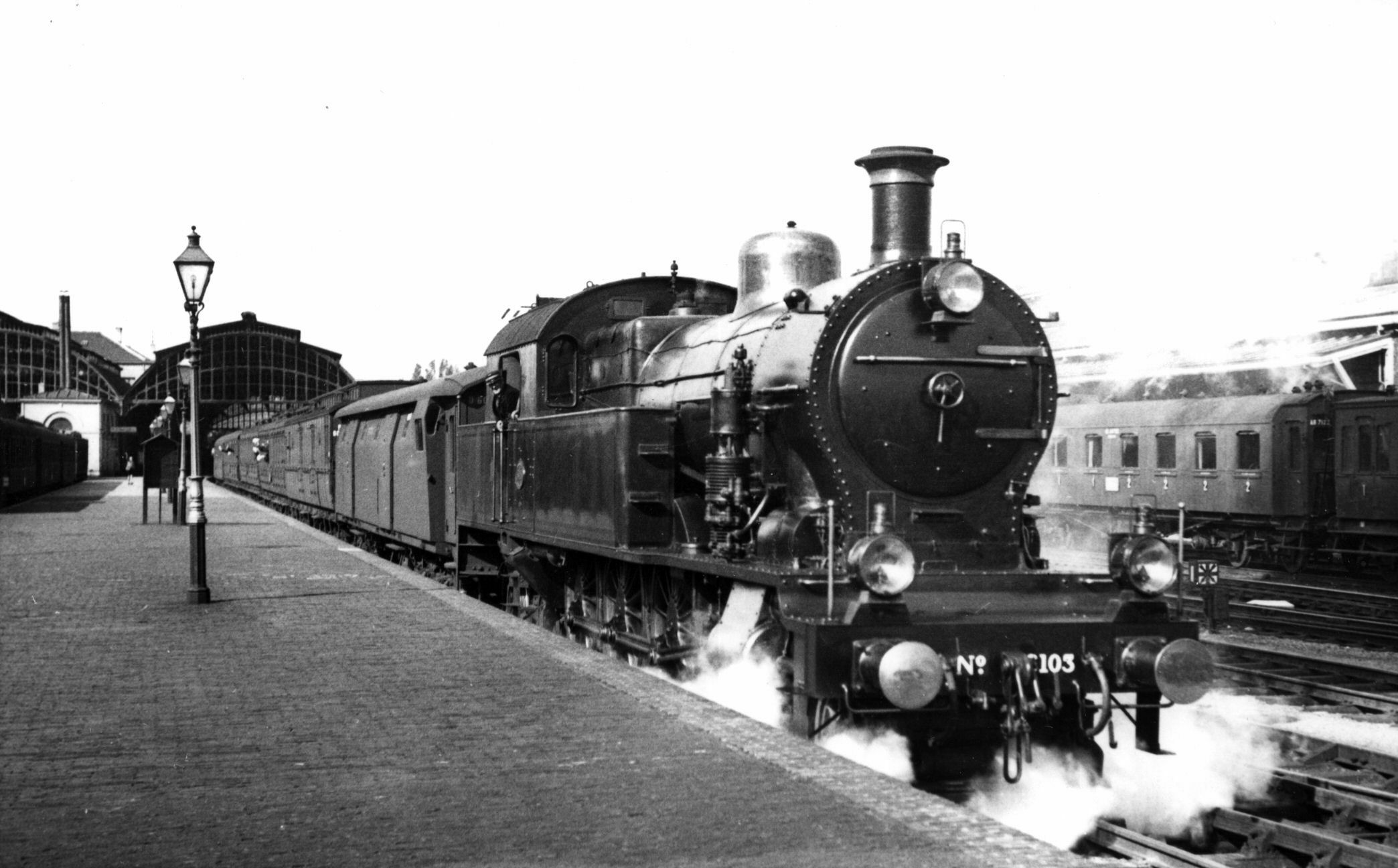
NS 6103 with a train to Germany at the NS station The Hague S.S. (October 1935)

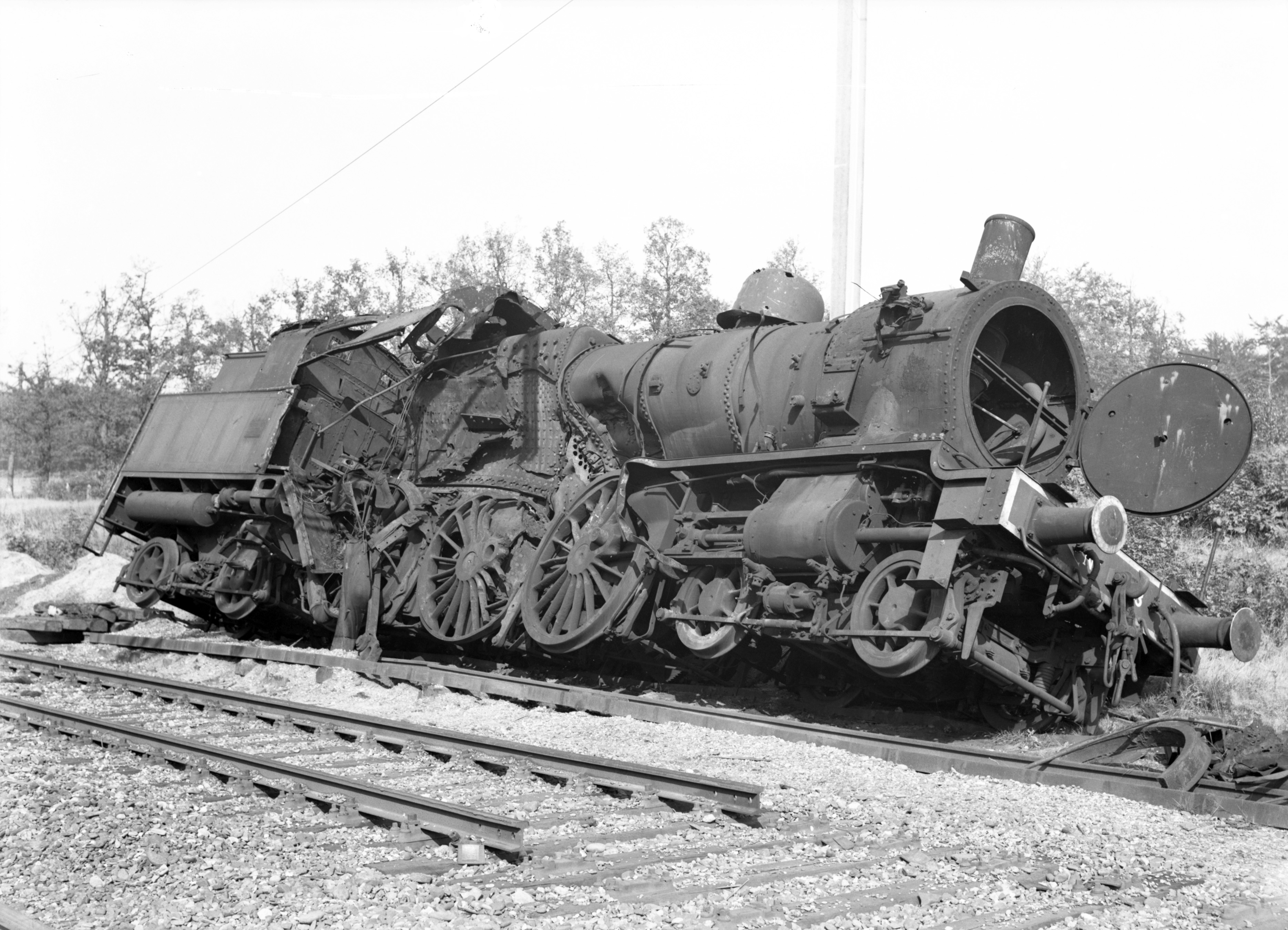
NS 6103 destroyed by a direct hit during the war.

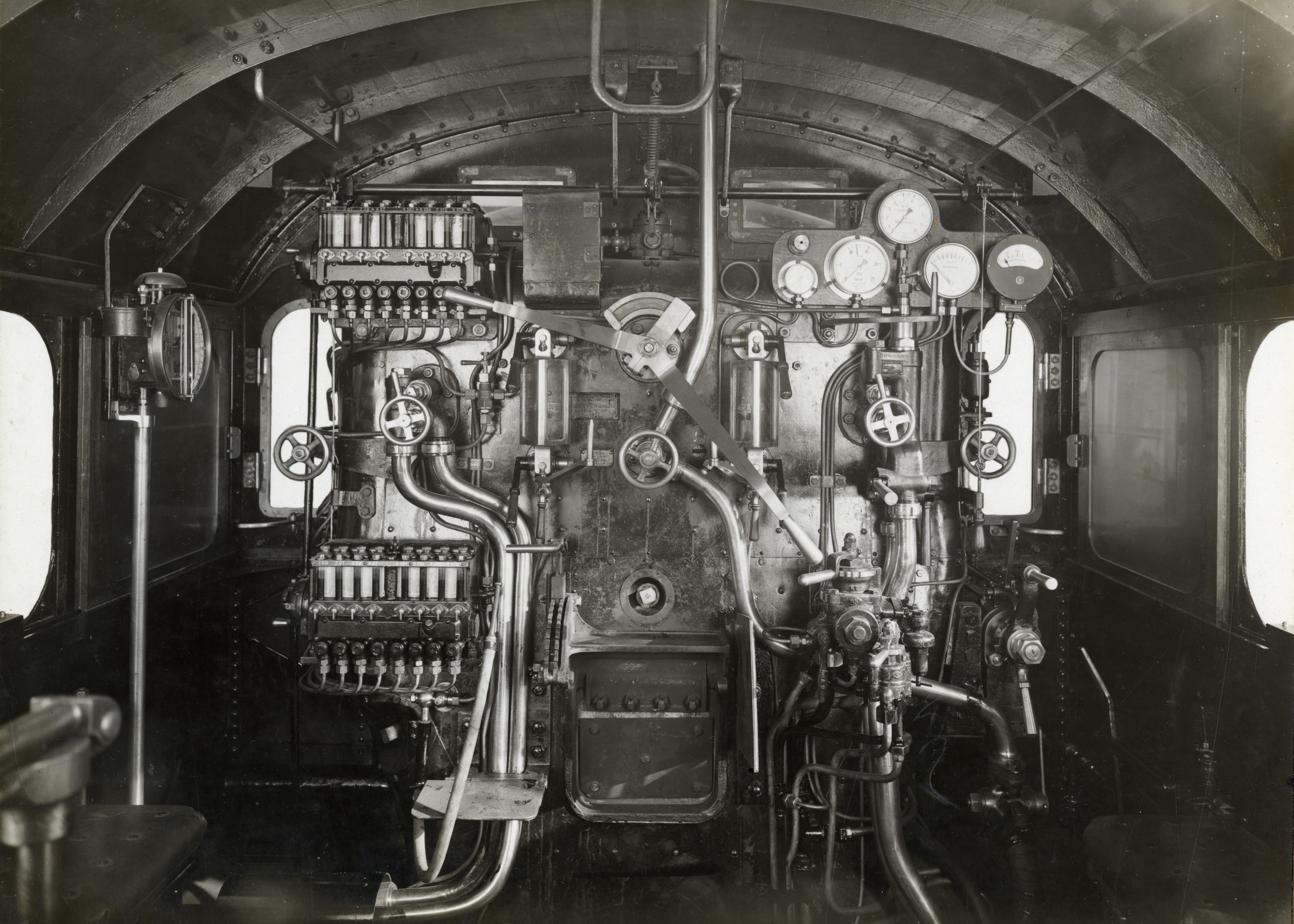
Cab of NS 6110 (1929)

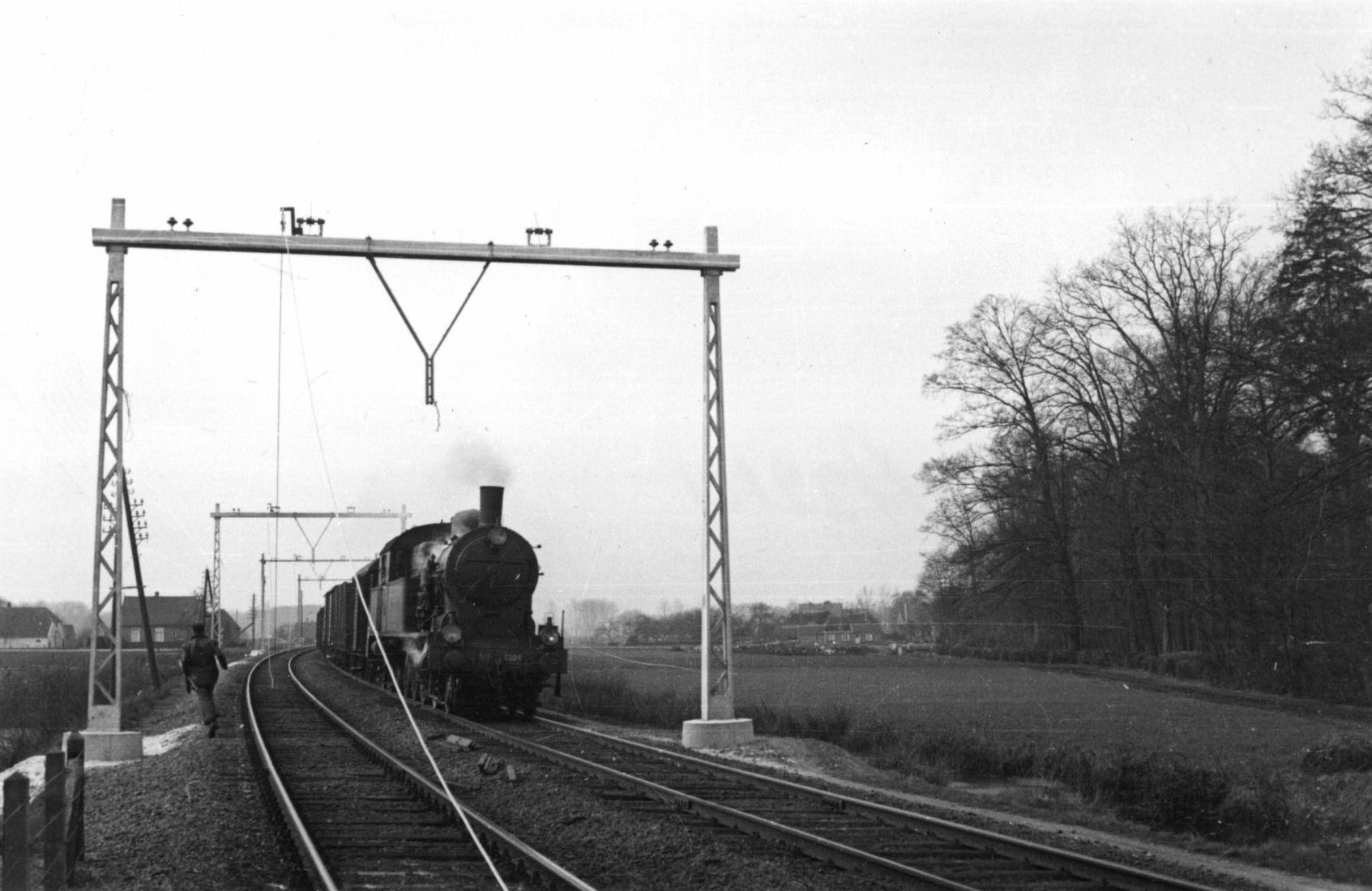
NS 6106 with a goods train during electrification work. (1952)

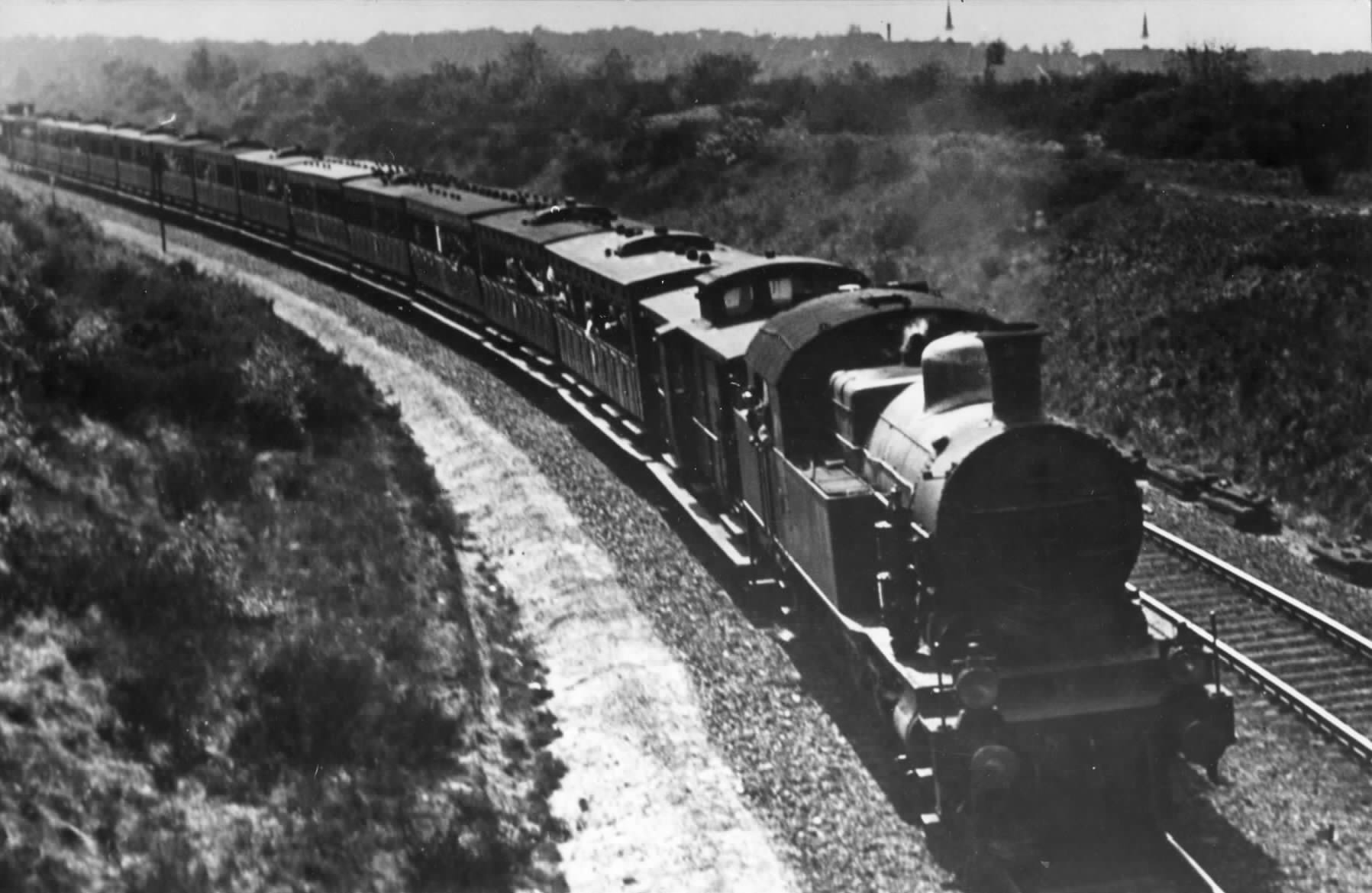
An NS 6100 with a passenger train in the cutting near Amersfoort. (Between 1930 and 1940)

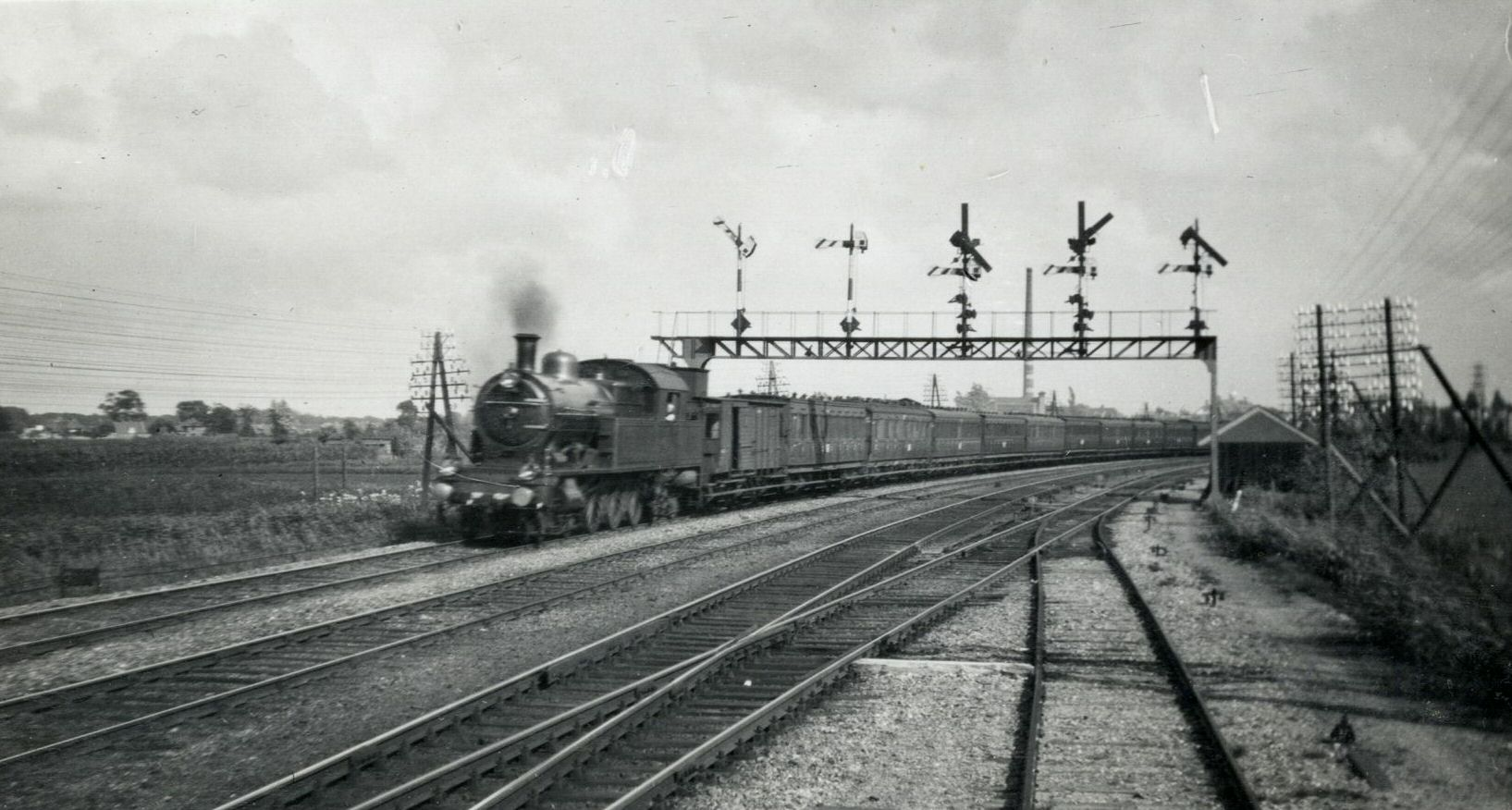
NS 6108 with an express train Enschede-Amsterdam near the signal gantry near Bussum. (Between 1925 and 1935)

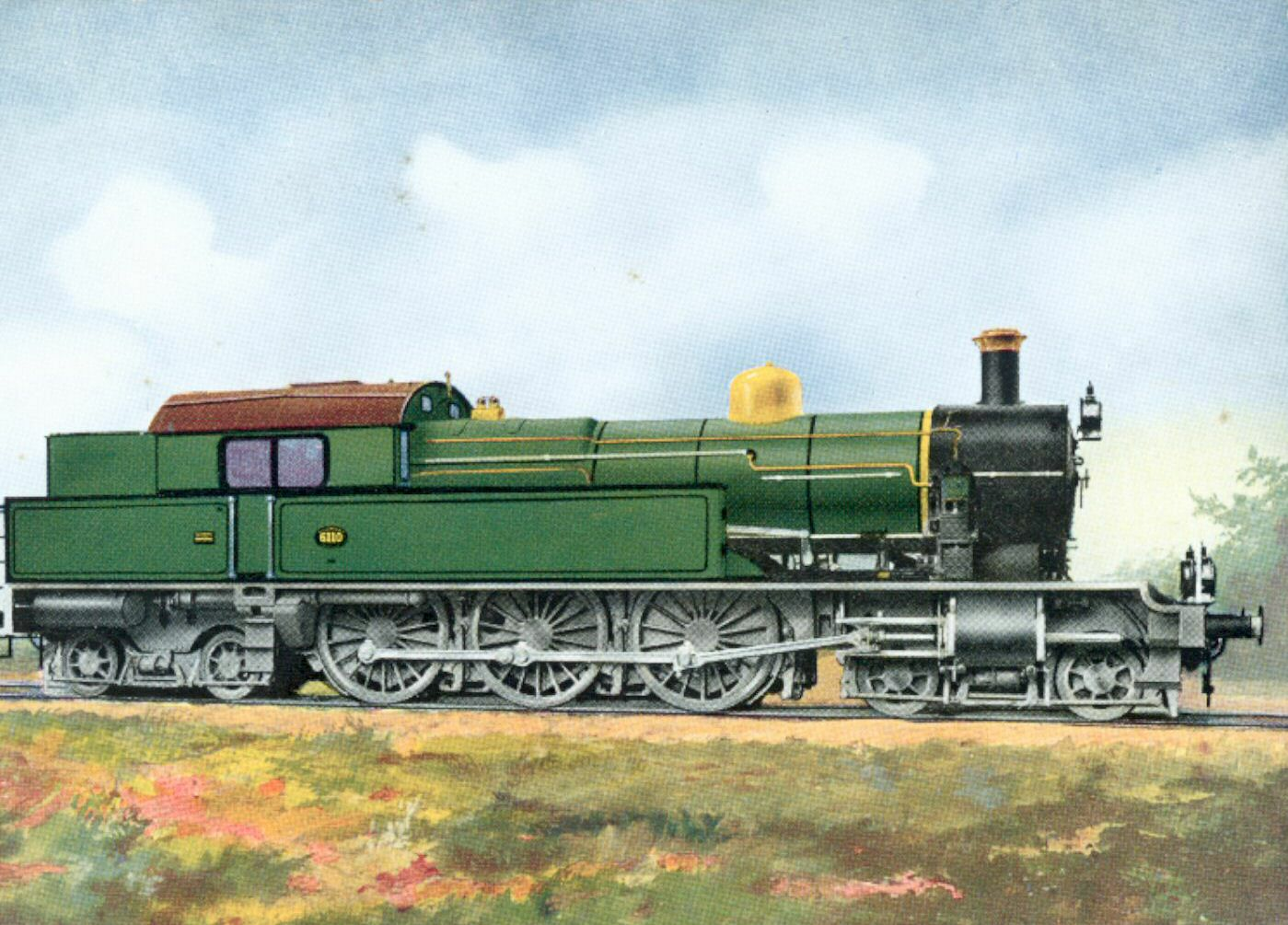
NS 6110

== Sources and references ==
- Paul Henken: Stoomlocomotieven NS-serie 6100. De geschiedenis van de Tenderjumbo's. Uquilair, Rosmalen, 2002. ISBN 90 71513 43 2
- H. Waldorp: Onze Nederlandse stoomlocomotieven in woord en beeld, (7e druk) uitgeverij De Alk, Alkmaar, 1986. ISBN 90-6013-947-X
- N. J. van Wijck Jurriaanse: Stoomlocomotieven van de nederlandse spoorwegen Uitg. Wyt, Rotterdam, 1972. ISBN 90-6007-517-X
- H. van Poll: Stoomtractie bij de Nederlandse Spoorwegen 1944~1958. Uitgeverij de Bataafsche Leeuw B.V. ISBN 90-6707-003-3
- A. Weijts: Tussen vuur en stoom. Uitg. Europese Bibliotheek, Zaltbommel, 2001. ISBN 90-288-26947
