= NS 1700 (steam locomotive) =

Dutch 4-4-0 locomotives

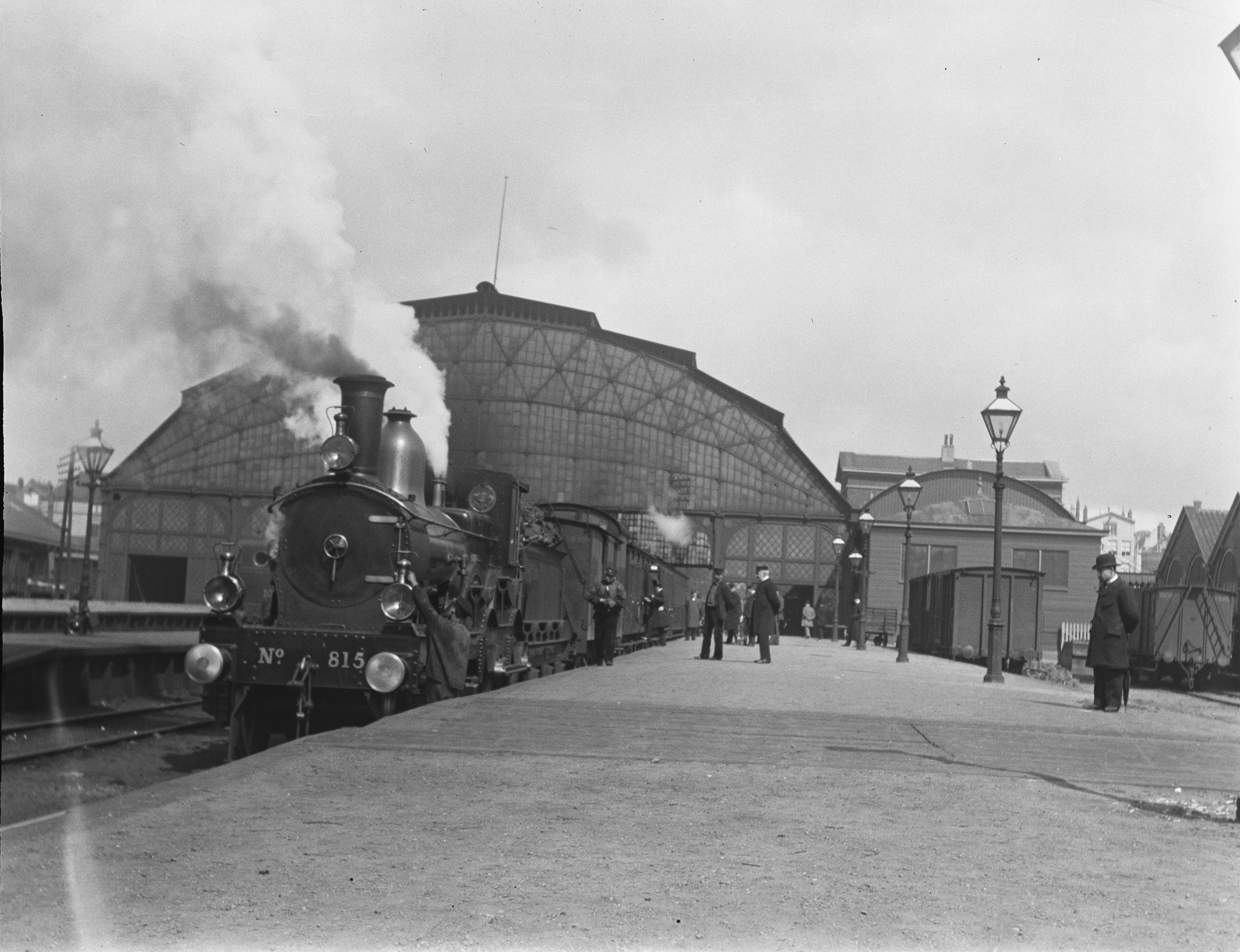
- SS 815 at Amsterdam Weesperpoort in 1902
Type and origin
- Power type: Steam
- Builder: Beyer, Peacock & Company, Werkspoor
- Build date: 1899 - 1907
- Total produced: 135
Specifications
- Configuration
  - Whyte: 4-4-0
  - UIC: 2'B
- Gauge: 1,435 mm (4 ft 8 1/2 in)
Career
- Operators: NS, SS
- Numbers: SS: 801-935; NS: 1701-1835, 1308-1433
- Nicknames: Hartjes; Overkokers; Bogies; Kleine Jumbo
- Disposition: All scrapped
- For a more detailed Specifications, see Specifications

The NS 1700 was a series of express steam locomotives of Nederlandse Spoorwegen and its predecessor Maatschappij tot Exploitatie van Staatsspoorwegen (SS).

== Design and construction ==
Due to the increasing weight of passenger trains, a new locomotive was designed based on the 301-475 series with a higher steam pressure and therefore a higher power. Compared to the series 300, the single axle was replaced by a four-wheeled bogie. The first 125 locomotives were built by Beyer, Peacock & Company of Manchester, England and delivered to the SS between 1899 and 1906 with numbers 801–925. During construction, the necessary improvements were made, some of which were subsequently adapted to the previously delivered locomotives. Subsequently, two batches of five locomotives were delivered by Werkspoor with the numbers 926–935.

== SS period (1899-1920) ==
The locomotives were delivered without superheater. After experiences with other superheated locomotives showing the advantage of this, the SS decided to also test a superheater on the series 800. After a failed attempt with the 856 in 1911, the 865 and 889 were fitted with a so-called fully loaded superheater in 1914. The cylinders were also renewed and the Stephenson valve gear was replaced by Walschaerts valve gear. The boiler had to be placed a little higher for this.

After good experiences with these two converted locomotives, six more locomotives followed in 1916, namely Nos. 900, 867, 895, 861, 916 and 908. In these six locomotives, the boiler was placed even higher, in order to simplify the steam slide movement. This eliminated the characteristic heart-shaped windows at the front of the cab and was replaced by elongated windows next to the raised firebox and two small rectangular windows above the firebox.

== NS period (1921-1943) ==
When the fleet of the HSM and the SS was merged in 1921, the locomotives of this series were given the NS numbers 1701–1835. The NS continued to rebuild a further 92 locomotives with superheaters, based on the last rebuild six, between 1921 and 1930. After the first locomotives were converted by the workshop in Tilburg, the NS needed help of Werkspoor in Amsterdam and Utrecht. Due to the financial crisis, as a result of which NS also had to revise its spending pattern, the serial conversion of 1700s with a superheater came to an end after one hundred locomotives. Nevertheless, between 1936 and 1939, four locomotives, whose boiler had to be replaced, were also fitted with a superheater. Plans to implement this for all remaining locomotives not yet fitted with superheater failed due to costs that were deemed too high. Meanwhile, in 1938, the withdrawal of the first locomotives of this series not fitted with superheater had already started.

In 1934 and 1935, the two test locomotives 1765 and 1789 (ex-SS 865 and 889) were rebuilt to the same standards as other locomotives fitted with superheaters. To distinguish between superheater and non-superheater locomotives, the remaining non-superheater locomotives were renumbered from April 1941 into the series 1308–1433, simply by replacing the 7 with a 3, or the 8 with a 4. The old series 1300 had already been withdrawn, so that these numbers were free to be used again. To prevent Tilburg workshop personnel from being put to work in Germany during the Second World War, two more locomotives were fitted with a superheater. No. 1392 and 1345 were put back into service as 1792 and 1745 in 1942 and 1943 respectively after their rebuild.

== NS period (1944-1958) ==
During World War II, several locomotives were taken, eight of which never returned and were reported missing. After the war, unsuperheated 1300s were withdrawn of between 1945 and 1947. The 1700s, fitted with a superheater, followed between 1951 and 1957. Many still usable boilers found a second life as a static boilers. No. 1794, used as such, was still able to drive independently to and from the coal stage for recoaling in 1958. Locomotive 1794 ran under its own power from Arnhem to Rotterdam Feijenoord on November 1, 1958, where the regulator was immediately removed, so that the locomotive could only be moved by another locomotive. in 1959 No. 1794 was scrapped. No engines are preserved.

== Specifications ==
| | Without superheater | With superheater (first test) | With superheater (series rebuild) |
|---|---|---|---|
| Numbers SS | 801-935 | 865, 889 | 861...916 |
| Numbers NS | Before 1942: 1701 - 1835; After 1942: 1308 - 1433 | 1765, 1789 | 1701..1835 |
| Weight locomotief | 49 t (54 short tons; 48 long tons) | 52 t (57 short tons; 51 long tons) | 53 t (58 short tons; 52 long tons) |
| Weight tender | 33 t (36 short tons; 32 long tons) | 33 t (36 short tons; 32 long tons) | 33 t (36 short tons; 32 long tons) |
| Driver diameter | 2,150 mm (7 ft 1 in) | 2,150 mm (7 ft 1 in) | 2,150 mm (7 ft 1 in) |
| Leading diameter | 1,219 mm (4 ft 0 in) | 1,219 mm (4 ft 0 in) | 1,240 mm (4 ft 1 in) |
| tender wheels | 1,219 mm (4 ft 0 in) | 1,219 mm (4 ft 0 in) | 1,240 mm (4 ft 1 in) |
| Length | 16,339 mm (53 ft 7.3 in), 16,455 mm (53 ft 11.8 in) (different buffers fitted) | 16,339 mm (53 ft 7.3 in) | 16,455 mm (53 ft 11.8 in) |
| Height | 4,305 mm (14 ft 1.5 in) | 4,305 mm (14 ft 1.5 in) | 4,408 mm (14 ft 5.5 in) |
| Speed | 90 km/h (56 mph) | 100 km/h (62 mph) | 100 km/h (62 mph) |
| Firebox heating area | 10 m^{2} (110 sq ft) | 11 m^{2} (120 sq ft) | 11.5 m^{2} (124 sq ft) |
| Tubes heating area | 93 m^{2} (1,000 sq ft) | 73.5 m^{2} (791 sq ft) | 73.5 m^{2} (791 sq ft) |
| Superheater area | - | 32 m^{2} (340 sq ft) | 29 m^{2} (310 sq ft) |
| Fire grate area | 2.10 m^{2} (22.6 sq ft) | 2.10 m^{2} (22.6 sq ft) | 2.10 m^{2} (22.6 sq ft) |
| Boiler pressure | 11 kg/cm^{2} (160 psi) | 11 kg/cm^{2} (160 psi) | 11 kg/cm^{2} (160 psi) |
| Cylinders | 2 | 2 | 2 |
| Cylinder size | 457 mm × 660 mm (18.0 in × 26.0 in) | 502 mm × 660 mm (19.8 in × 26.0 in) | 508 mm × 660 mm (20.0 in × 26.0 in) |
| Valve gear | Stephenson | Walschaerts | Walschaerts |
| Water capacity | 13 m^{3} (2,900 imp gal) | 13 m^{3} (2,900 imp gal) | 13 m^{3} (2,900 imp gal) |
| Fuel capacity | 4 t (4.4 short tons; 3.9 long tons) | 4 t (4.4 short tons; 3.9 long tons) | 4 t (4.4 short tons; 3.9 long tons) |
| Tractive effort | 48.35 kN (10,870 lbf) | 58.35 kN (13,120 lbf) | 59.82 kN (13,450 lbf) |
| Power class | P^{3} | PO^{1} | PO^{1} |

== Overview ==
| Builder | Lot no. | Date built | SS number | Rebuilding with superheater by the SS | NS number | Rebuilding with superheater by the NS | NS number 1941 without superheater | Withdrawn | Notes |
|---|---|---|---|---|---|---|---|---|---|
| Beyer, Peacock & Company | 4075 | 1899 | 801 | | 1701 | 1926 | | 1953 | |
| Beyer, Peacock & Company | 4076 | 1899 | 802 | | 1702 | 1923 | | 1954 | |
| Beyer, Peacock & Company | 4077 | 1899 | 803 | | 1703 | 1929 | | 1956 | |
| Beyer, Peacock & Company | 4078 | 1899 | 804 | | 1704 | 1923 | | 1954 | |
| Beyer, Peacock & Company | 4079 | 1899 | 805 | | 1705 | 1925 | | 1955 | |
| Beyer, Peacock & Company | 4080 | 1899 | 806 | | 1706 | 1930 | | 1957 | |
| Beyer, Peacock & Company | 4081 | 1899 | 807 | | 1707 | 1923 | | 1956 | |
| Beyer, Peacock & Company | 4082 | 1899 | 808 | | 1708 | - | 1308 | 1947 | |
| Beyer, Peacock & Company | 4083 | 1899 | 809 | | 1709 | 1923 | | 1952 | |
| Beyer, Peacock & Company | 4084 | 1899 | 810 | | 1710 | 1923 | | 1951 | |
| Beyer, Peacock & Company | 4085 | 1899 | 811 | | 1711 | 1923 | | 1947 | |
| Beyer, Peacock & Company | 4086 | 1899 | 812 | | 1712 | - | 1312 | 1947 | |
| Beyer, Peacock & Company | 4087 | 1899 | 813 | | 1713 | 1926 | | 1952 | |
| Beyer, Peacock & Company | 4088 | 1899 | 814 | | 1714 | 1927 | | 1952 | |
| Beyer, Peacock & Company | 4089 | 1899 | 815 | | 1715 | 1923 | | 1953 | |
| Beyer, Peacock & Company | 4165 | 1900 | 816 | | 1716 | 1923 | | 1953 | |
| Beyer, Peacock & Company | 4166 | 1900 | 817 | | 1717 | 1923 | | 1947 | |
| Beyer, Peacock & Company | 4167 | 1900 | 818 | | 1718 | 1929 | | 1953 | |
| Beyer, Peacock & Company | 4168 | 1900 | 819 | | 1719 | - | 1319 | 1947 | |
| Beyer, Peacock & Company | 4169 | 1900 | 820 | | 1720 | 1923 | | 1956 | |
| Beyer, Peacock & Company | 4170 | 1900 | 821 | | 1721 | 1925 | | 1952 | |
| Beyer, Peacock & Company | 4171 | 1900 | 822 | | 1722 | 1926 | | 1947 | |
| Beyer, Peacock & Company | 4172 | 1900 | 823 | | 1723 | 1927 | | 1954 | |
| Beyer, Peacock & Company | 4173 | 1900 | 824 | | 1724 | 1923 | | 1953 | |
| Beyer, Peacock & Company | 4174 | 1900 | 825 | | 1725 | 1927 | | 1955 | |
| Beyer, Peacock & Company | 4175 | 1900 | 826 | | 1726 | 1936 | | 1952 | |
| Beyer, Peacock & Company | 4176 | 1900 | 827 | | 1727 | 1923 | | 1953 | |
| Beyer, Peacock & Company | 4177 | 1900 | 828 | | 1728 | - | - | 1938 | |
| Beyer, Peacock & Company | 4178 | 1900 | 829 | | 1729 | 1926 | | 1952 | |
| Beyer, Peacock & Company | 4179 | 1901 | 830 | | 1730 | 1923 | | 1957 | |
| Beyer, Peacock & Company | 4180 | 1901 | 831 | | 1731 | 1929 | | 1954 | |
| Beyer, Peacock & Company | 4181 | 1901 | 832 | | 1732 | 1923 | | 1952 | |
| Beyer, Peacock & Company | 4182 | 1901 | 833 | | 1733 | - | 1333 | 1947 | |
| Beyer, Peacock & Company | 4183 | 1901 | 834 | | 1734 | 1923 | | 1957 | |
| Beyer, Peacock & Company | 4184 | 1901 | 835 | | 1735 | 1923 | | 1952 | |
| Beyer, Peacock & Company | 4267 | 1901 | 836 | | 1736 | - | 1336 | 1947 | |
| Beyer, Peacock & Company | 4268 | 1901 | 837 | | 1737 | 1926 | | 1954 | |
| Beyer, Peacock & Company | 4269 | 1901 | 838 | | 1738 | 1928 | | 1952 | |
| Beyer, Peacock & Company | 4270 | 1901 | 839 | | 1739 | 1928 | | 1953 | |
| Beyer, Peacock & Company | 4271 | 1901 | 840 | | 1740 | - | - | 1938 | |
| Beyer, Peacock & Company | 4272 | 1901 | 841 | | 1741 | 1926 | | 1957 | |
| Beyer, Peacock & Company | 4273 | 1901 | 842 | | 1742 | - | 1342 | 1947 | |
| Beyer, Peacock & Company | 4274 | 1901 | 843 | | 1743 | 1922 | | 1947 | |
| Beyer, Peacock & Company | 4275 | 1901 | 844 | | 1744 | 1929 | | 1954 | |
| Beyer, Peacock & Company | 4276 | 1901 | 845 | | 1745 | 1943 | 1345, in 1943: 1745 | 1950 | Missing after World war II |
| Beyer, Peacock & Company | 4277 | 1901 | 846 | | 1746 | 1929 | | 1954 | |
| Beyer, Peacock & Company | 4278 | 1901 | 847 | | 1747 | 1930 | | 1952 | |
| Beyer, Peacock & Company | 4279 | 1901 | 848 | | 1748 | 1937 | | 1954 | |
| Beyer, Peacock & Company | 4280 | 1901 | 849 | | 1749 | 1925 | | 1951 | |
| Beyer, Peacock & Company | 4281 | 1901 | 850 | | 1750 | 1926 | | 1952 | |
| Beyer, Peacock & Company | 4282 | 1901 | 851 | | 1751 | - | - | 1938 | |
| Beyer, Peacock & Company | 4283 | 1901 | 852 | | 1752 | 1929 | | 1952 | |
| Beyer, Peacock & Company | 4284 | 1901 | 853 | | 1753 | 1928 | | 1954 | |
| Beyer, Peacock & Company | 4285 | 1901 | 854 | | 1754 | 1925 | | 1952 | |
| Beyer, Peacock & Company | 4286 | 1901 | 855 | | 1755 | 1930 | | 1947 | |
| Beyer, Peacock & Company | 4287 | 1901 | 856 | | 1756 | 1927 | | 1950 | |
| Beyer, Peacock & Company | 4288 | 1901 | 857 | | 1757 | 1930 | | 1953 | |
| Beyer, Peacock & Company | 4289 | 1901 | 858 | | 1758 | - | 1358 | 1947 | |
| Beyer, Peacock & Company | 4290 | 1901 | 859 | | 1759 | - | 1359 | 1947 | |
| Beyer, Peacock & Company | 4291 | 1901 | 860 | | 1760 | 1925 | | 1957 | |
| Beyer, Peacock & Company | 4292 | 1901 | 861 | 1916 | 1761 | | | 1952 | |
| Beyer, Peacock & Company | 4293 | 1901 | 862 | | 1762 | 1926 | | 1956 | |
| Beyer, Peacock & Company | 4294 | 1901 | 863 | | 1763 | 1930 | | 1955 | |
| Beyer, Peacock & Company | 4295 | 1901 | 864 | | 1764 | - | 1364 | 1954 | |
| Beyer, Peacock & Company | 4296 | 1901 | 865 | 1914 | 1765 | | | 1952 | |
| Beyer, Peacock & Company | 4321 | 1902 | 866 | | 1766 | 1927 | | 1952 | |
| Beyer, Peacock & Company | 4322 | 1902 | 867 | 1916 | 1767 | | | 1951 | |
| Beyer, Peacock & Company | 4323 | 1902 | 868 | | 1768 | 1925 | | 1950 | |
| Beyer, Peacock & Company | 4324 | 1902 | 869 | | 1769 | 1923 | | 1951 | |
| Beyer, Peacock & Company | 4325 | 1902 | 870 | | 1770 | 1926 | | 1950 | Missing after World war II |
| Beyer, Peacock & Company | 4326 | 1902 | 871 | | 1771 | 1926 | | 1952 | |
| Beyer, Peacock & Company | 4327 | 1902 | 872 | | 1772 | 1922 | | 1953 | |
| Beyer, Peacock & Company | 4328 | 1902 | 873 | | 1773 | 1926 | | 1953 | |
| Beyer, Peacock & Company | 4329 | 1902 | 874 | | 1774 | 1926 | | 1954 | |
| Beyer, Peacock & Company | 4330 | 1902 | 875 | | 1775 | 1926 | | 1953 | |
| Beyer, Peacock & Company | 4331 | 1902 | 876 | | 1776 | 1928 | | 1953 | |
| Beyer, Peacock & Company | 4332 | 1902 | 877 | | 1777 | 1929 | | 1954 | |
| Beyer, Peacock & Company | 4333 | 1902 | 878 | | 1778 | 1928 | | 1951 | |
| Beyer, Peacock & Company | 4334 | 1902 | 879 | | 1779 | 1925 | | 1954 | |
| Beyer, Peacock & Company | 4335 | 1902 | 880 | | 1780 | 1926 | | 1956 | |
| Beyer, Peacock & Company | 4336 | 1902 | 881 | | 1781 | - | | 1938 | |
| Beyer, Peacock & Company | 4337 | 1902 | 882 | | 1782 | 1927 | | 1952 | |
| Beyer, Peacock & Company | 4338 | 1902 | 883 | | 1783 | - | 1383 | 1948 | Missing after World war II |
| Beyer, Peacock & Company | 4339 | 1902 | 884 | | 1784 | 1923 | | 1952 | |
| Beyer, Peacock & Company | 4340 | 1902 | 885 | | 1785 | 1924 | | 1953 | |
| Beyer, Peacock & Company | 4341 | 1902 | 886 | | 1786 | 1925 | | 1947 | |
| Beyer, Peacock & Company | 4342 | 1902 | 887 | | 1787 | 1926 | | 1954 | |
| Beyer, Peacock & Company | 4343 | 1902 | 888 | | 1788 | 1926 | | 1950 | Missing after World war II |
| Beyer, Peacock & Company | 4344 | 1902 | 889 | 1914 | 1789 | - | - | 1952 | |
| Beyer, Peacock & Company | 4345 | 1902 | 890 | | 1790 | - | 1390 | 1948 | Missing after World war II |
| Beyer, Peacock & Company | 4346 | 1902 | 891 | | 1791 | 1926 | | 1953 | |
| Beyer, Peacock & Company | 4347 | 1902 | 892 | | 1792 | 1942 | 1392, in 1942: 1792 | 1956 | |
| Beyer, Peacock & Company | 4348 | 1902 | 893 | | 1793 | 1924 | | 1952 | |
| Beyer, Peacock & Company | 4349 | 1902 | 894 | | 1794 | 1937 | | 1957 | |
| Beyer, Peacock & Company | 4350 | 1902 | 895 | 1916 | 1795 | - | - | 1955 | |
| Beyer, Peacock & Company | 4724 | 1905 | 896 | | 1796 | - | - | 1938 | |
| Beyer, Peacock & Company | 4725 | 1905 | 897 | | 1797 | 1921 | | 1954 | |
| Beyer, Peacock & Company | 4726 | 1905 | 898 | | 1798 | - | 1398 | 1947 | |
| Beyer, Peacock & Company | 4727 | 1905 | 899 | | 1799 | - | 1399 | 1949 | |
| Beyer, Peacock & Company | 4728 | 1906 | 900 | 1916 | 1800 | - | - | 1954 | |
| Beyer, Peacock & Company | 4729 | 1906 | 901 | | 1801 | 1922 | | 1952 | |
| Beyer, Peacock & Company | 4730 | 1906 | 902 | | 1802 | 1924 | | 1955 | |
| Beyer, Peacock & Company | 4731 | 1906 | 903 | | 1803 | 1925 | | 1947 | |
| Beyer, Peacock & Company | 4732 | 1906 | 904 | | 1804 | 1929 | | 1955 | |
| Beyer, Peacock & Company | 4733 | 1906 | 905 | | 1805 | 1925 | | 1952 | |
| Beyer, Peacock & Company | 4846 | 1906 | 906 | | 1806 | 1925 | | 1954 | |
| Beyer, Peacock & Company | 4847 | 1906 | 907 | | 1807 | - | - | 1939 | |
| Beyer, Peacock & Company | 4848 | 1906 | 908 | 1916 | 1808 | | | 1947 | |
| Beyer, Peacock & Company | 4849 | 1906 | 909 | | 1809 | - | 1409 | 1948 | Missing after World war II |
| Beyer, Peacock & Company | 4850 | 1906 | 910 | | 1810 | - | - | 1939 | |
| Beyer, Peacock & Company | 4851 | 1906 | 911 | | 1811 | 1930 | | 1952 | |
| Beyer, Peacock & Company | 4852 | 1906 | 912 | | 1812 | 1925 | | 1955 | |
| Beyer, Peacock & Company | 4853 | 1906 | 913 | | 1813 | - | 1413 | 1945 | |
| Beyer, Peacock & Company | 4854 | 1906 | 914 | | 1814 | - | 1414 | 1947 | |
| Beyer, Peacock & Company | 4855 | 1906 | 915 | | 1815 | 1922 | | 1957 | |
| Beyer, Peacock & Company | 4856 | 1906 | 916 | 1916 | 1816 | | | 1954 | |
| Beyer, Peacock & Company | 4857 | 1906 | 917 | | 1817 | 1925 | | 1950 | Missing after World war II |
| Beyer, Peacock & Company | 4858 | 1906 | 918 | | 1818 | 1930 | | 1955 | |
| Beyer, Peacock & Company | 4859 | 1906 | 919 | | 1819 | 1939 | | 1953 | |
| Beyer, Peacock & Company | 4860 | 1906 | 920 | | 1820 | - | 1420 | 1945 | |
| Beyer, Peacock & Company | 4861 | 1906 | 921 | | 1821 | - | - | 1938 | |
| Beyer, Peacock & Company | 4862 | 1906 | 922 | | 1822 | 1925 | | 1947 | |
| Beyer, Peacock & Company | 4863 | 1906 | 923 | | 1823 | - | 1423 | 1947 | |
| Beyer, Peacock & Company | 4864 | 1906 | 924 | | 1824 | 1925 | | 1950 | Missing after World war II |
| Beyer, Peacock & Company | 4865 | 1906 | 925 | | 1825 | - | 1425 | 1945 | |
| Werkspoor | 161 | 1906 | 926 | | 1826 | 1924 | | 1953 | |
| Werkspoor | 162 | 1906 | 927 | | 1827 | 1923 | | 1956 | |
| Werkspoor | 163 | 1906 | 928 | | 1828 | 1924 | | 1953 | |
| Werkspoor | 164 | 1906 | 929 | | 1829 | 1924 | | 1955 | |
| Werkspoor | 165 | 1906 | 930 | | 1830 | 1925 | | 1947 | |
| Werkspoor | 172 | 1907 | 931 | | 1831 | 1922 | | 1952 | |
| Werkspoor | 173 | 1907 | 932 | | 1832 | - | 1432 | 1947 | |
| Werkspoor | 174 | 1907 | 933 | | 1833 | - | 1433 | 1947 | |
| Werkspoor | 175 | 1907 | 934 | | 1834 | 1925 | | 1955 | |
| Werkspoor | 176 | 1907 | 935 | | 1835 | 1926 | | 1954 | |

== Gallery ==
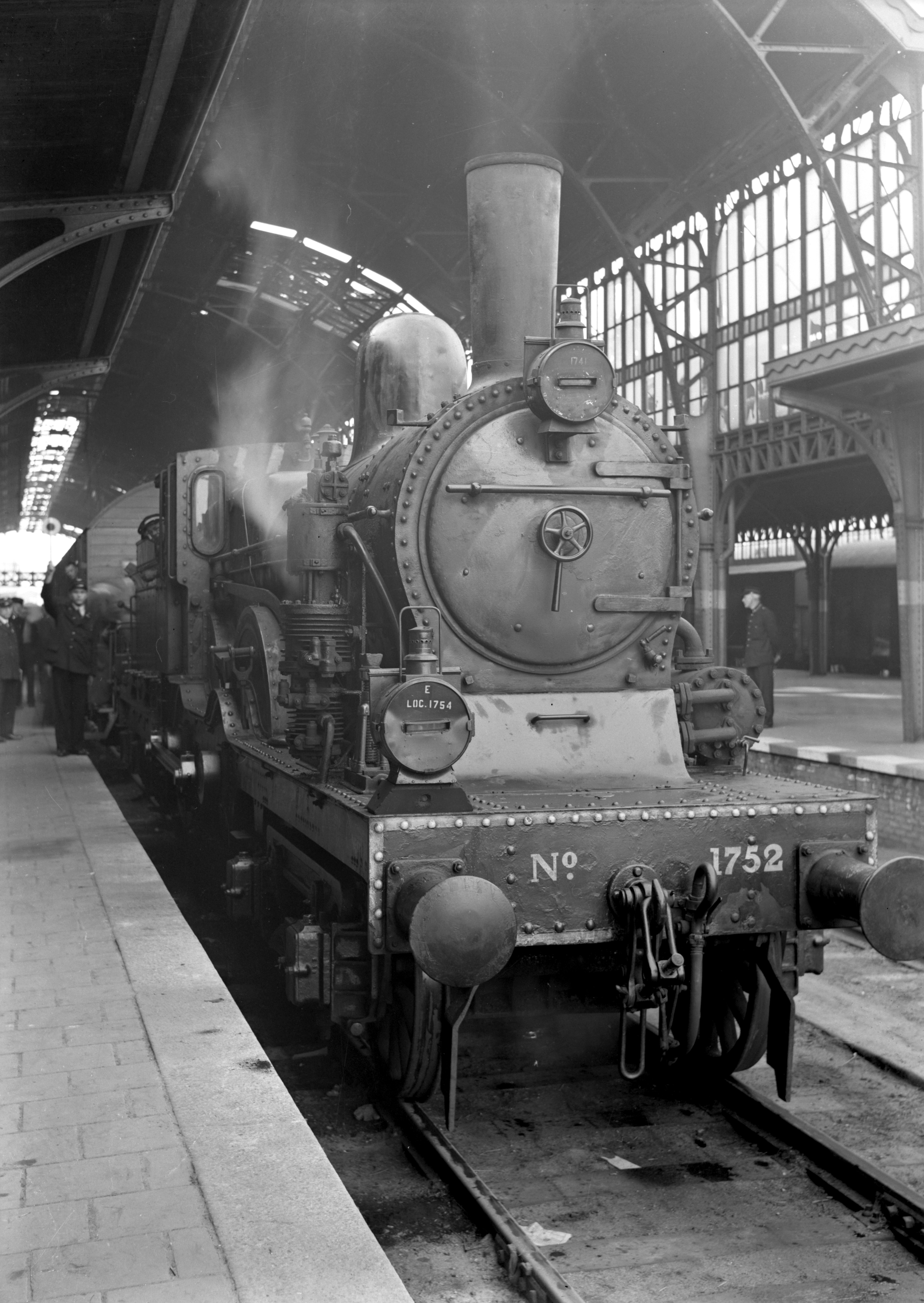
NS 1752 with the first train after the war. (15-05-1945)

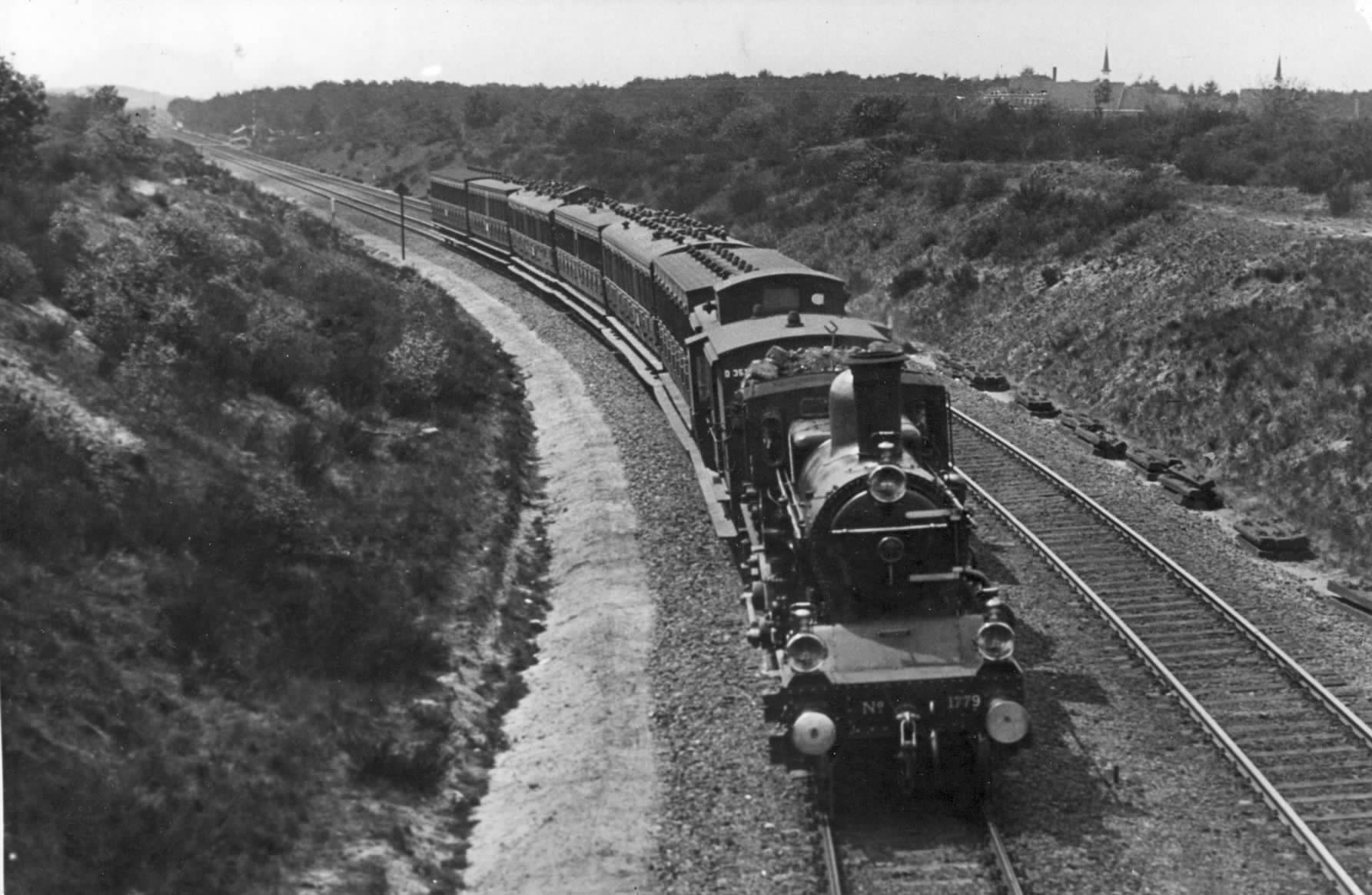
NS 1779 with a train near Amersfoort. (June 1938)

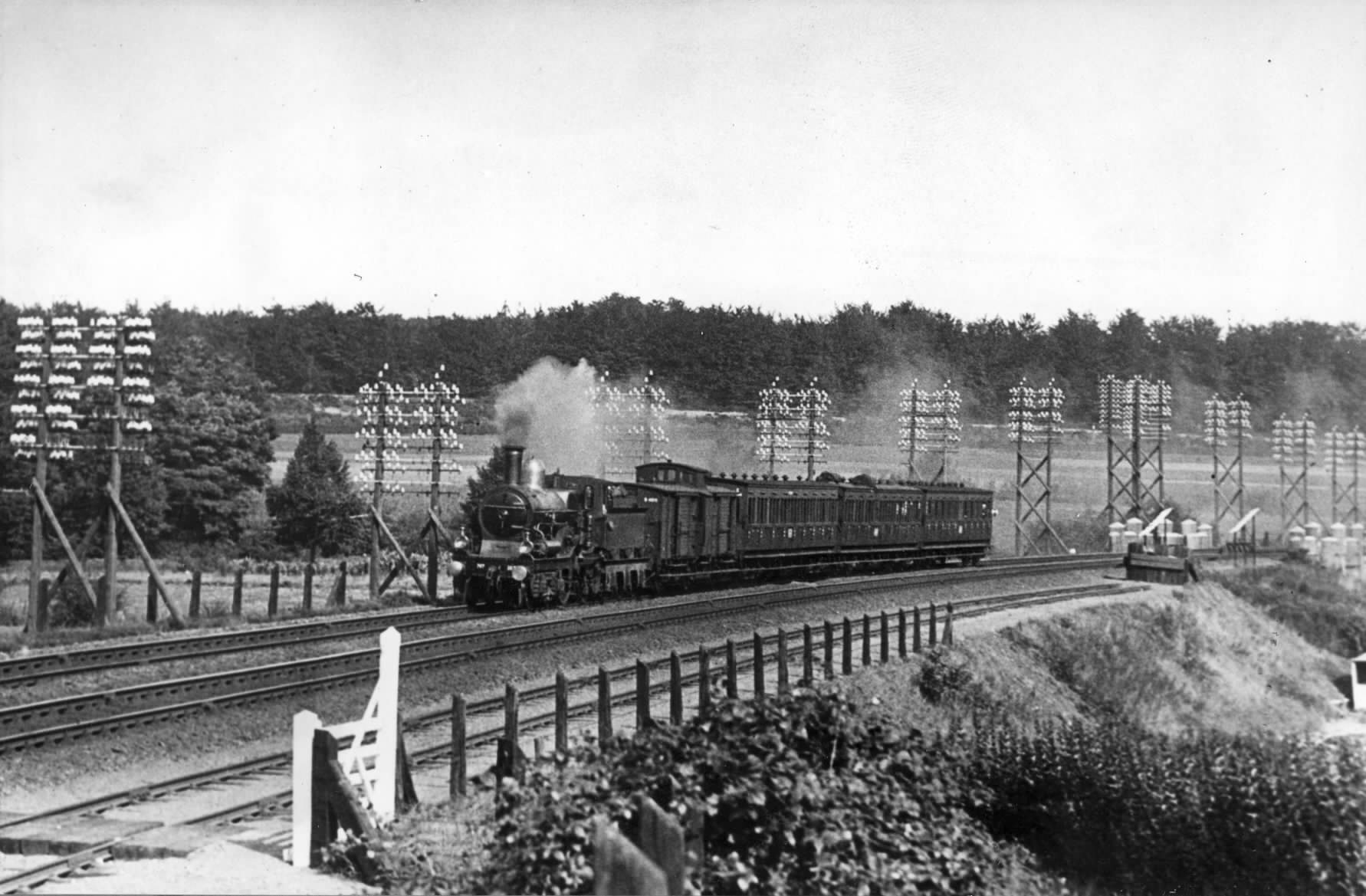
A locomotive of the series 1700/1800 with a train near Oosterbeek Laag. (08-08-1938)

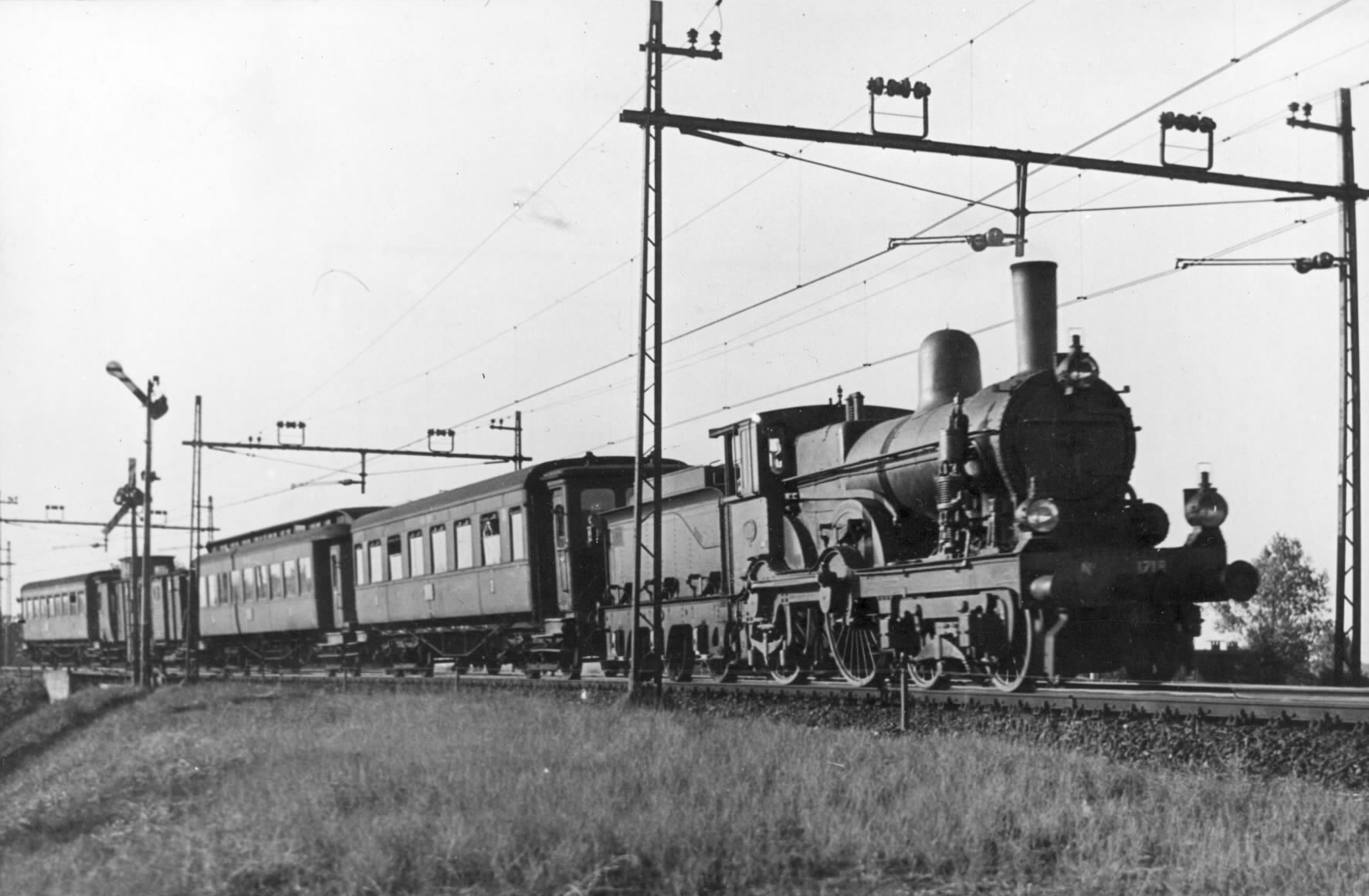
NS 1718 with an empty stock train, as the last steam train on the electrified route Rotterdam Hofplein - The Hague, near Leidschendam. (31-10-1947)

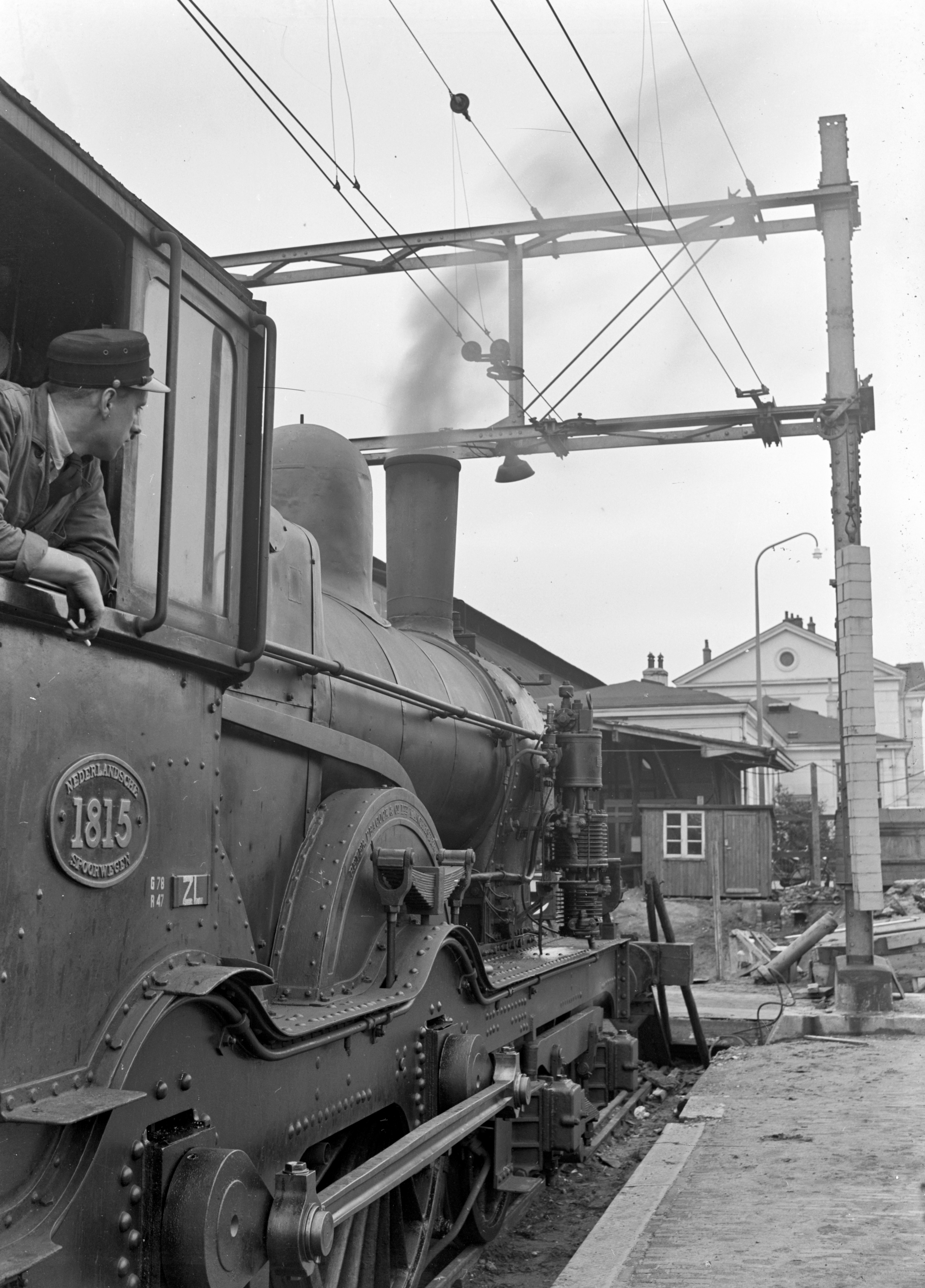
NS 1815 along the platform of Zwolle station. (04-09-1951)

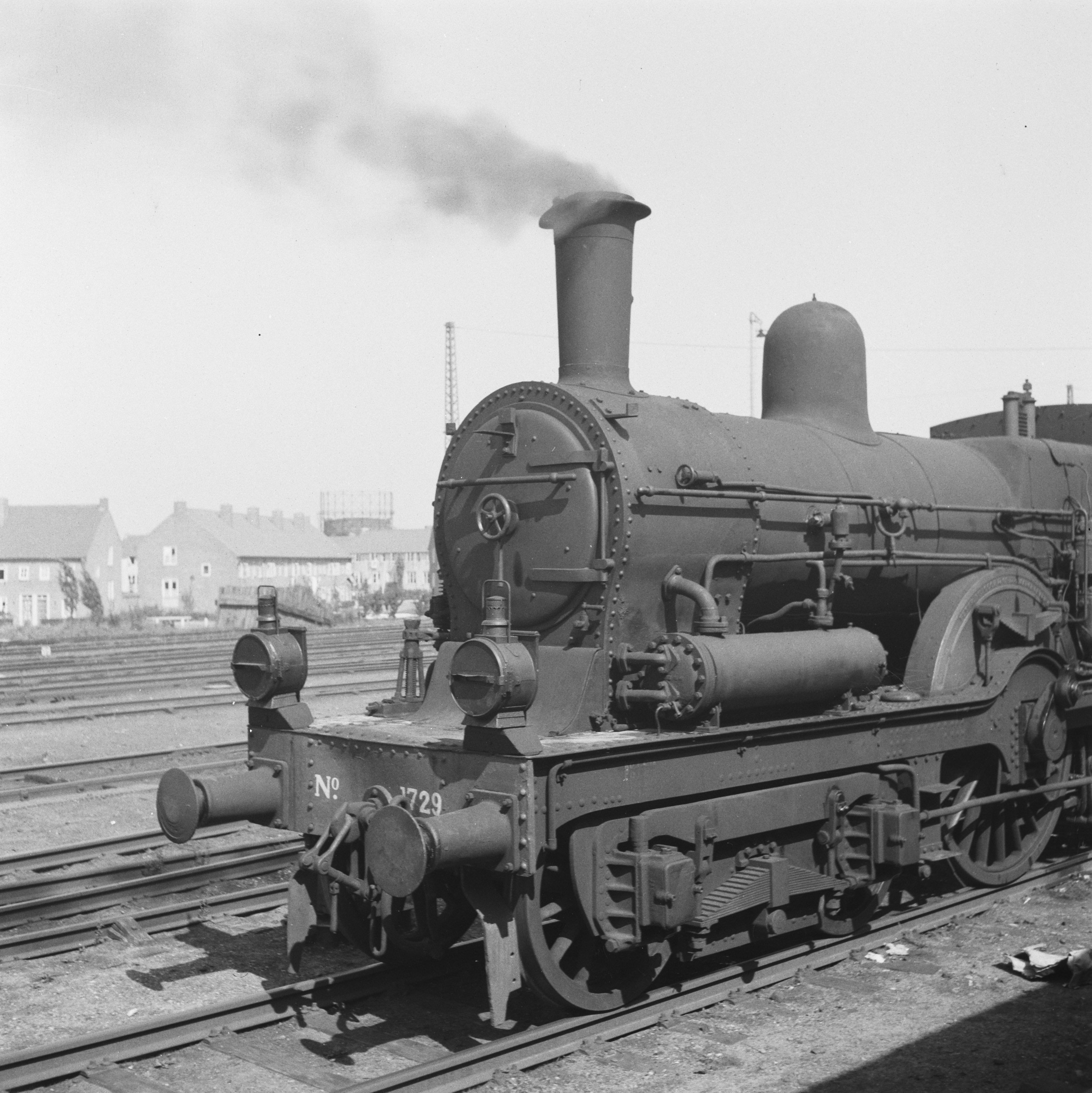
NS 1729. (1945)

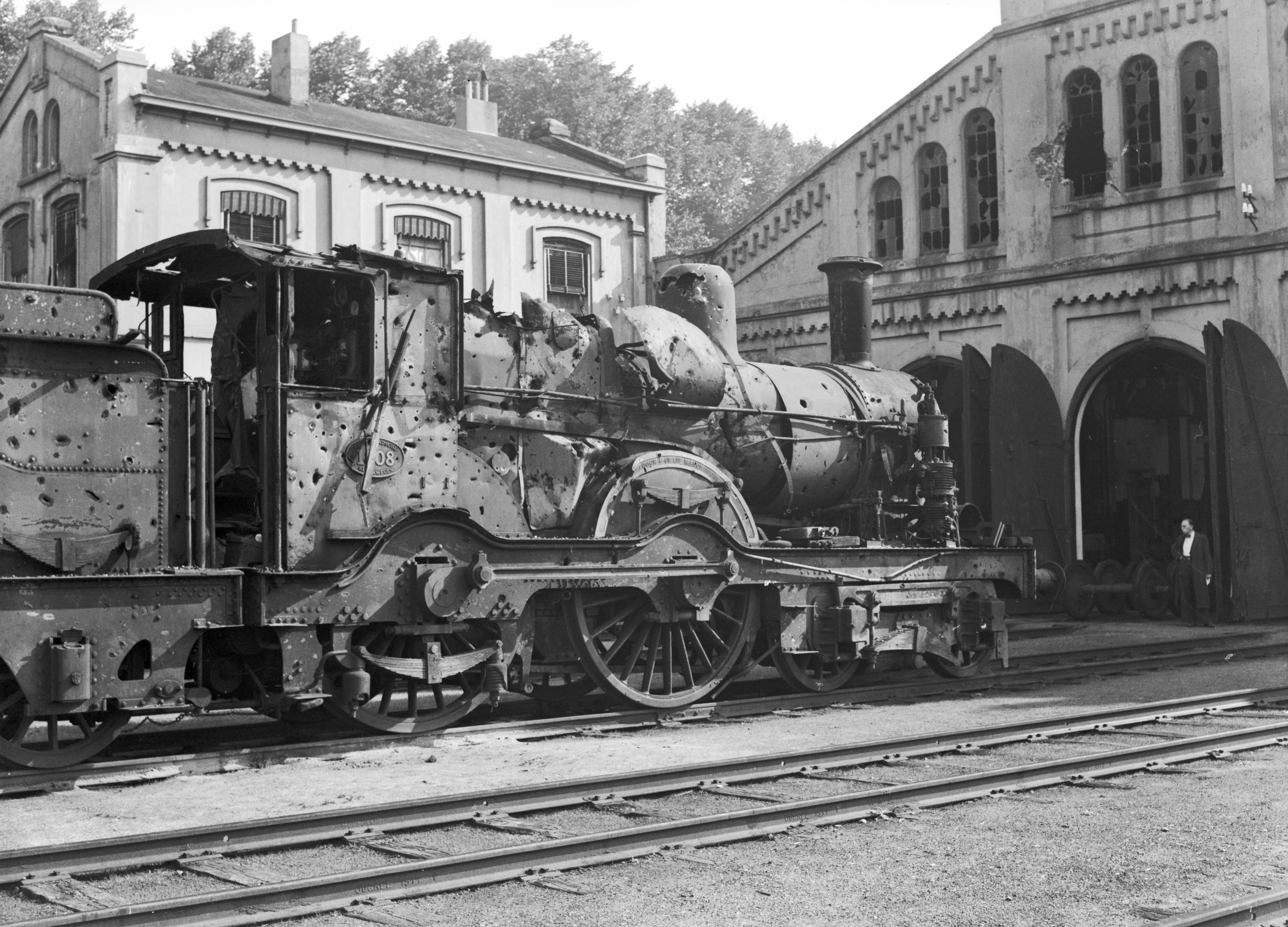
NS 1808 damaged by the war at the locomotive depot in Arnhem. (1945 - 1946)

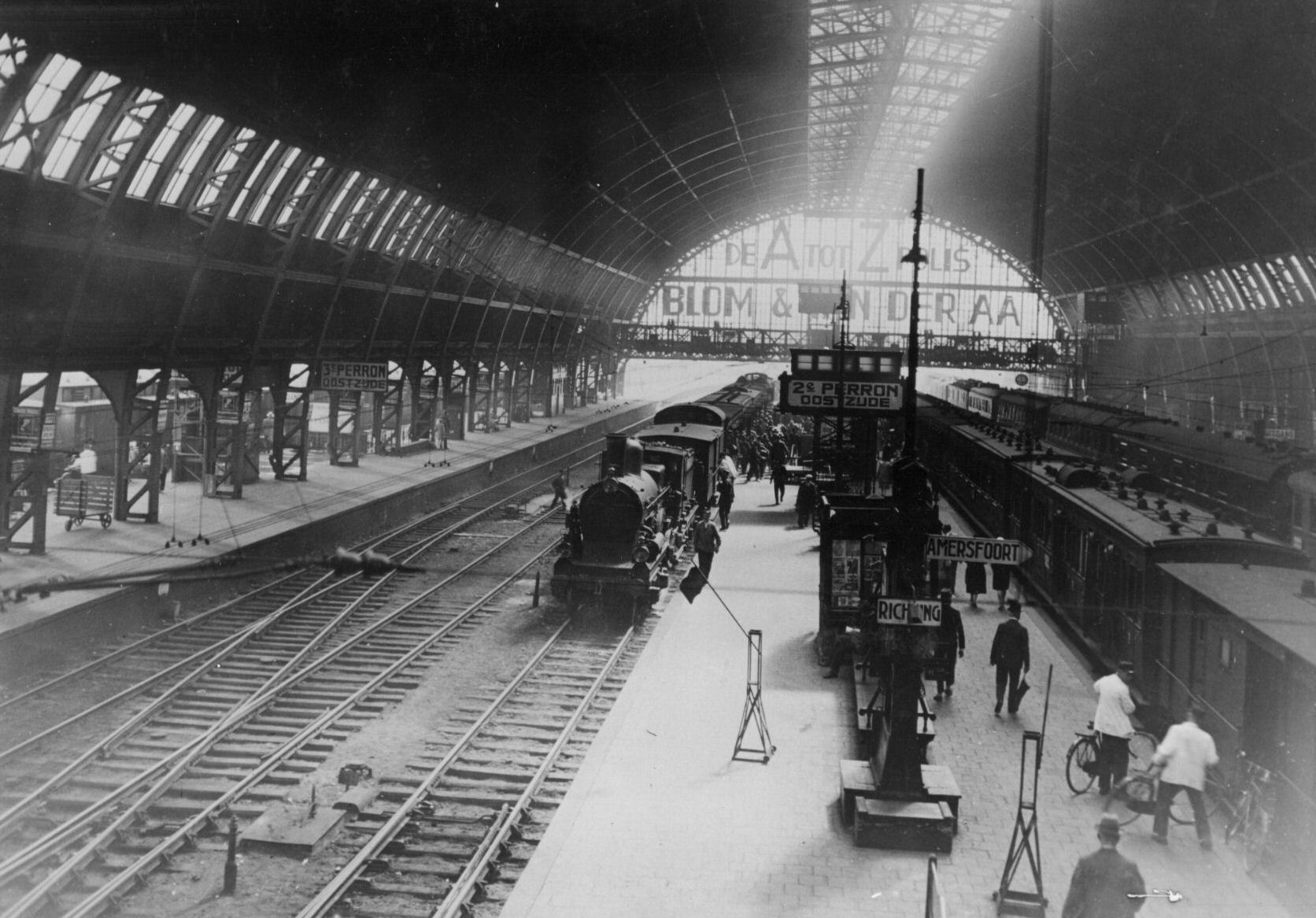
View of the platforms under the 1st platform roof of Amsterdam C.S. with a steam locomotive from the 1700/1800 series in the middle. (1930 - 1939)

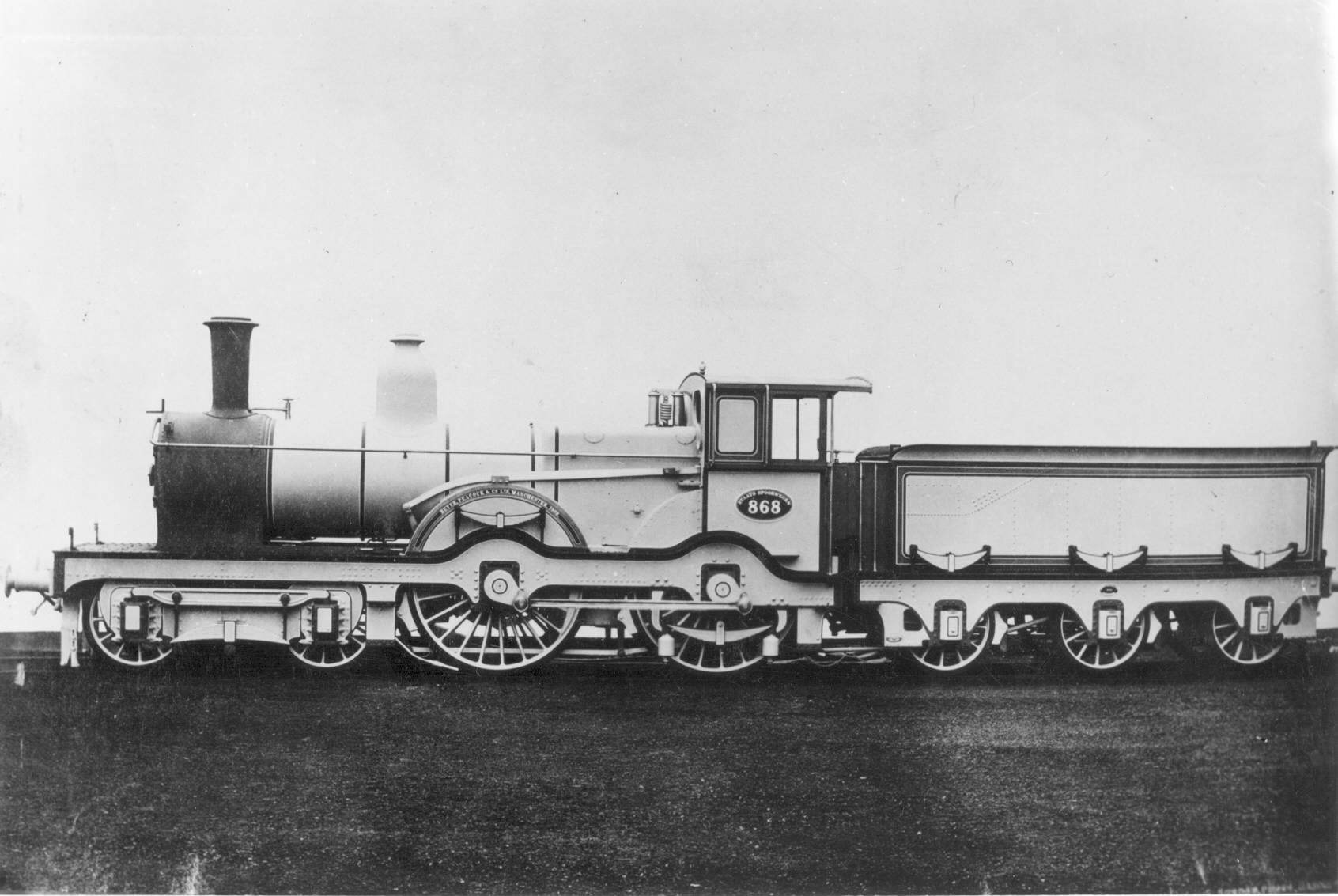
NS 1768 presumably factory new. (1902)

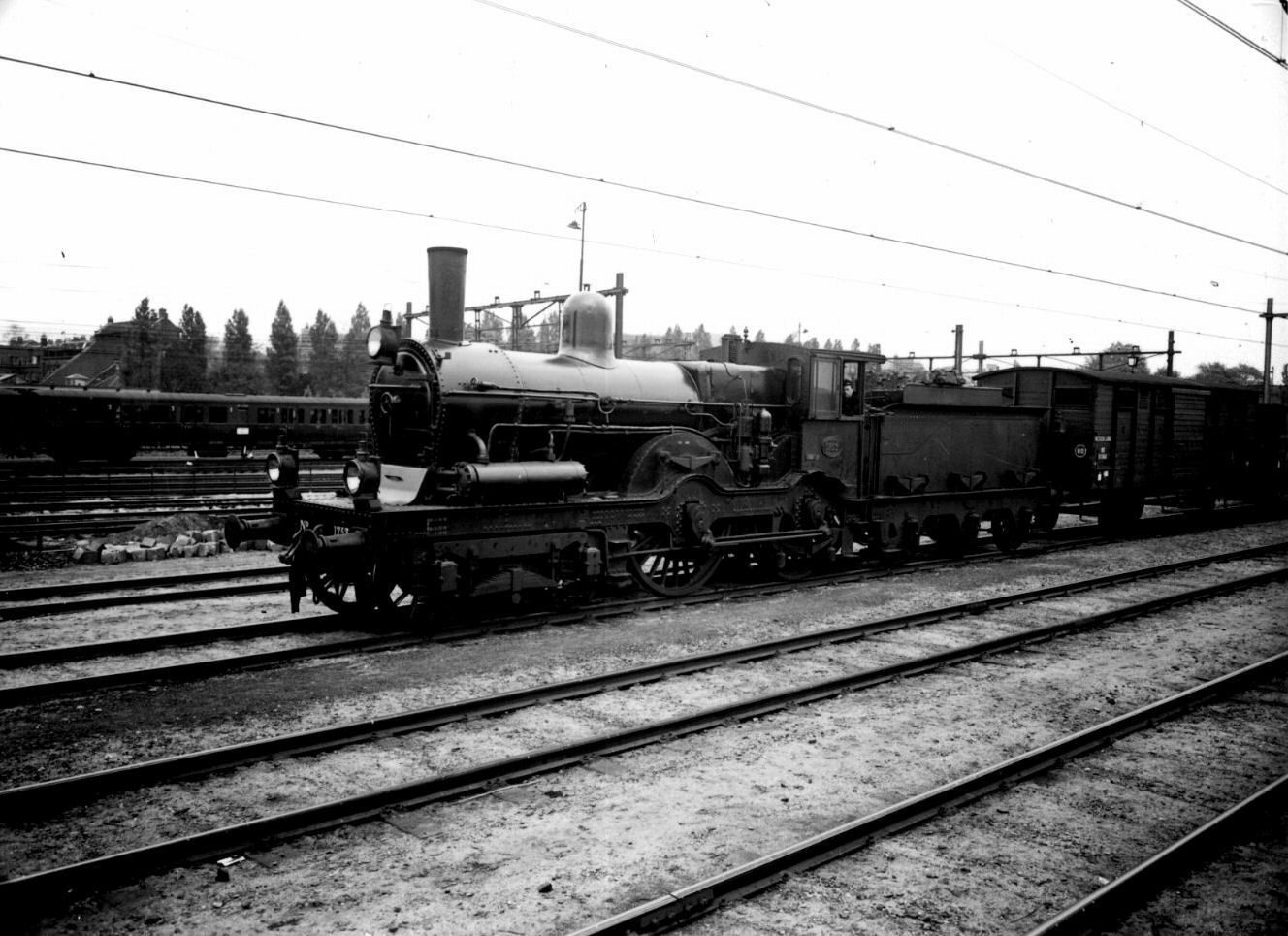
NS 1753 with a goods train. (1945 - 1954)

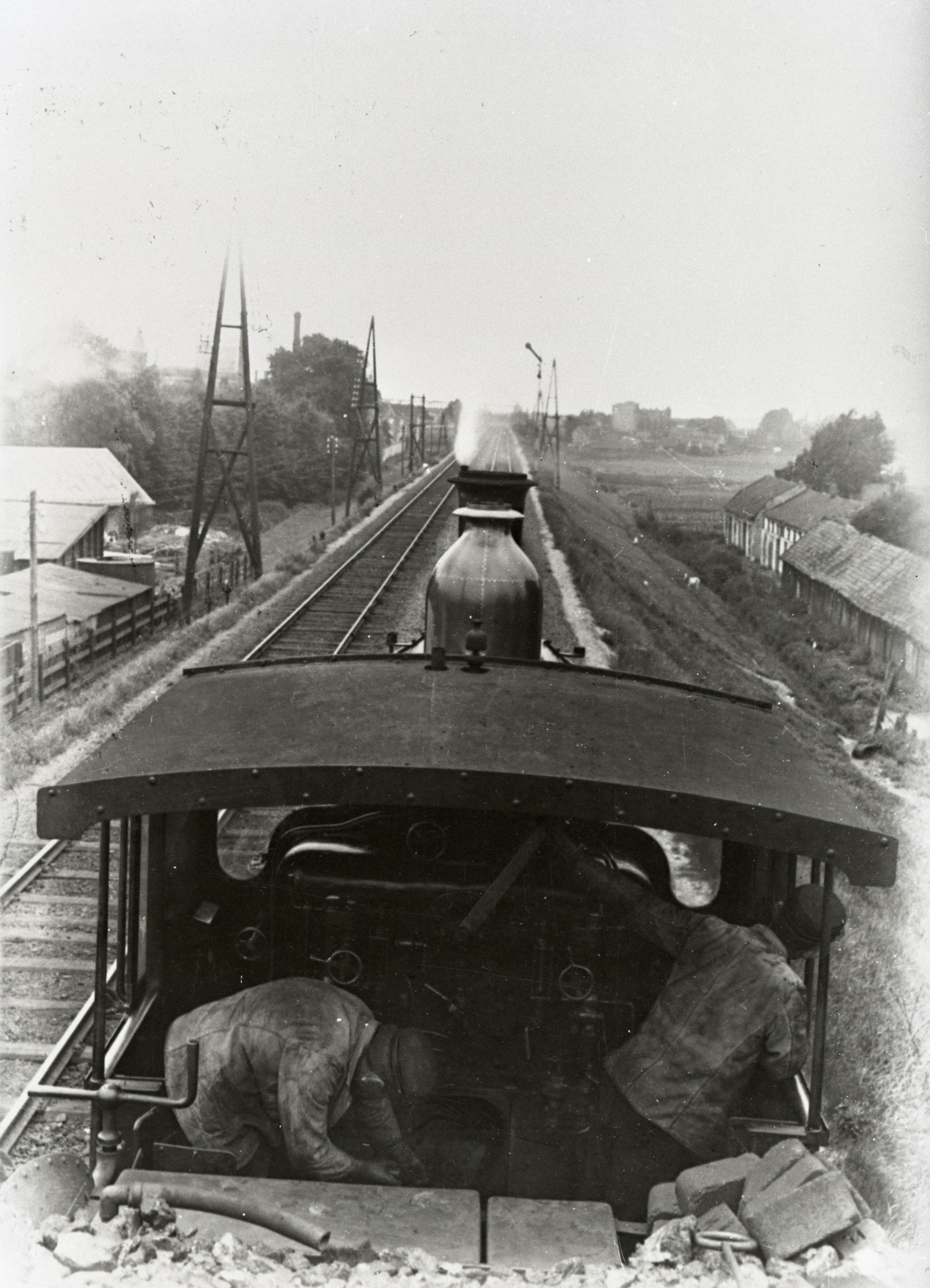
View of the railway and the cab with driver and fireman from the tender. (1910 - 1913)

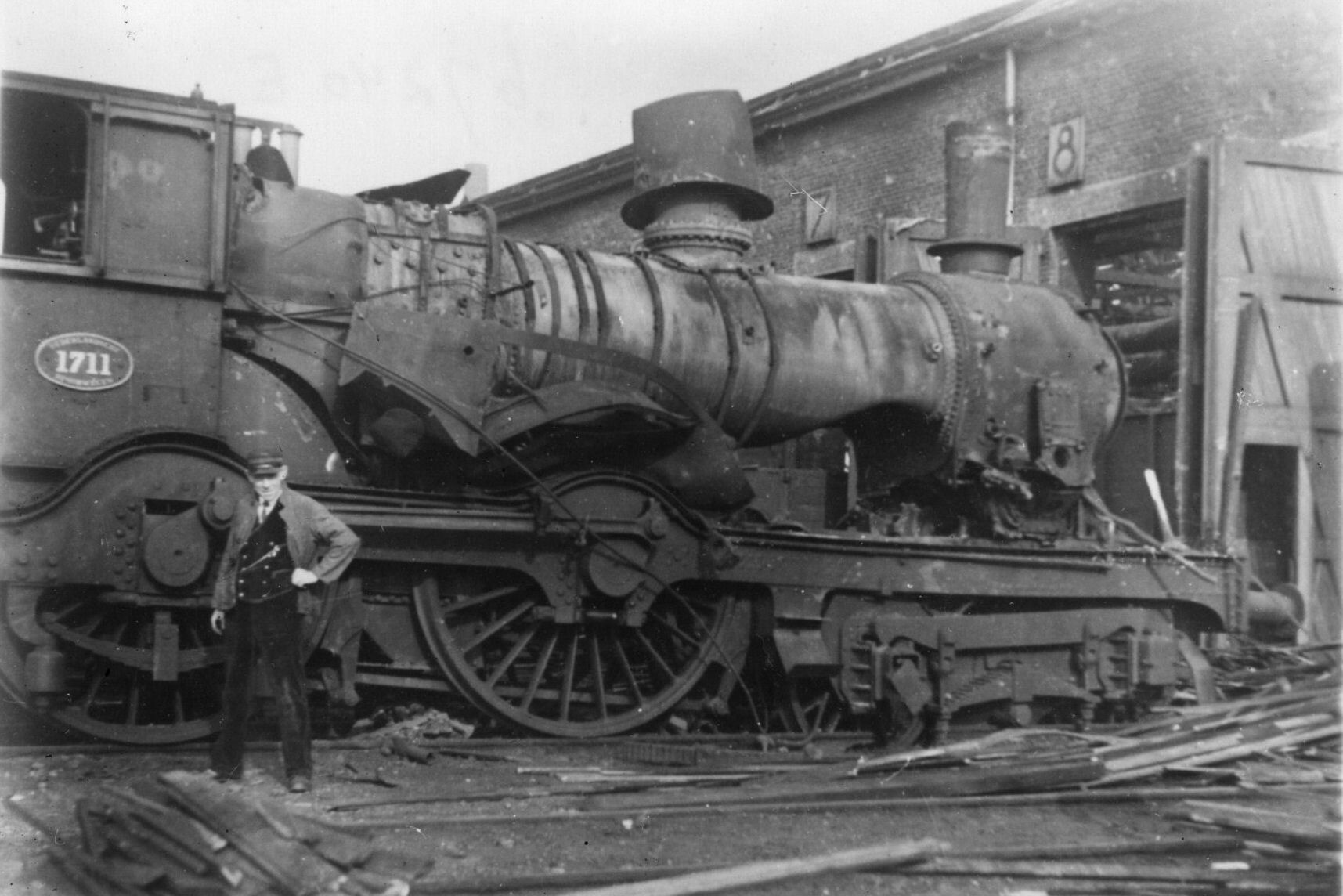
The NS 1711 was burned in during the war at Maastricht. (September 1944)

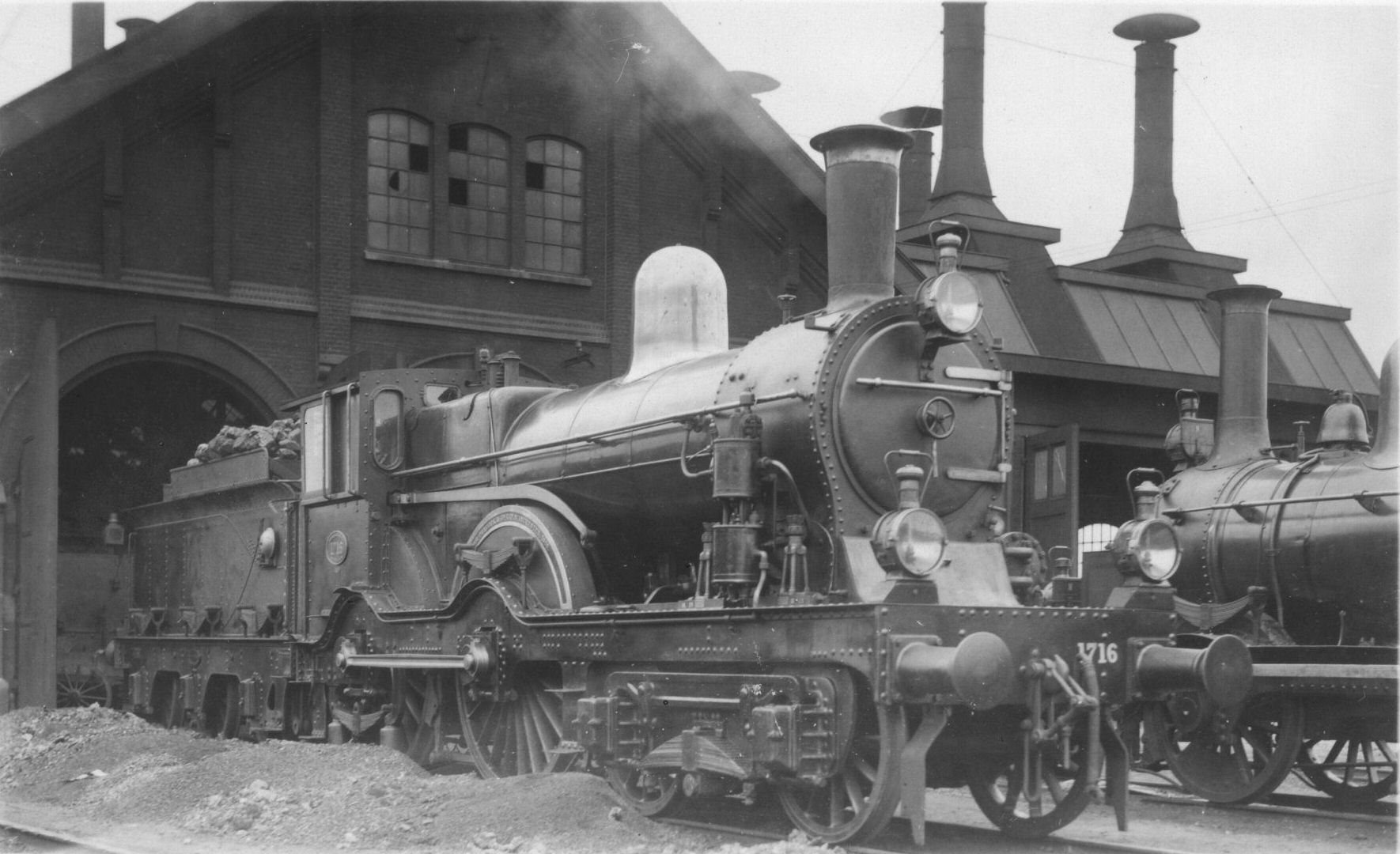
NS 1716 at the locomotive shed in Amersfoort. (1930 - 1935)

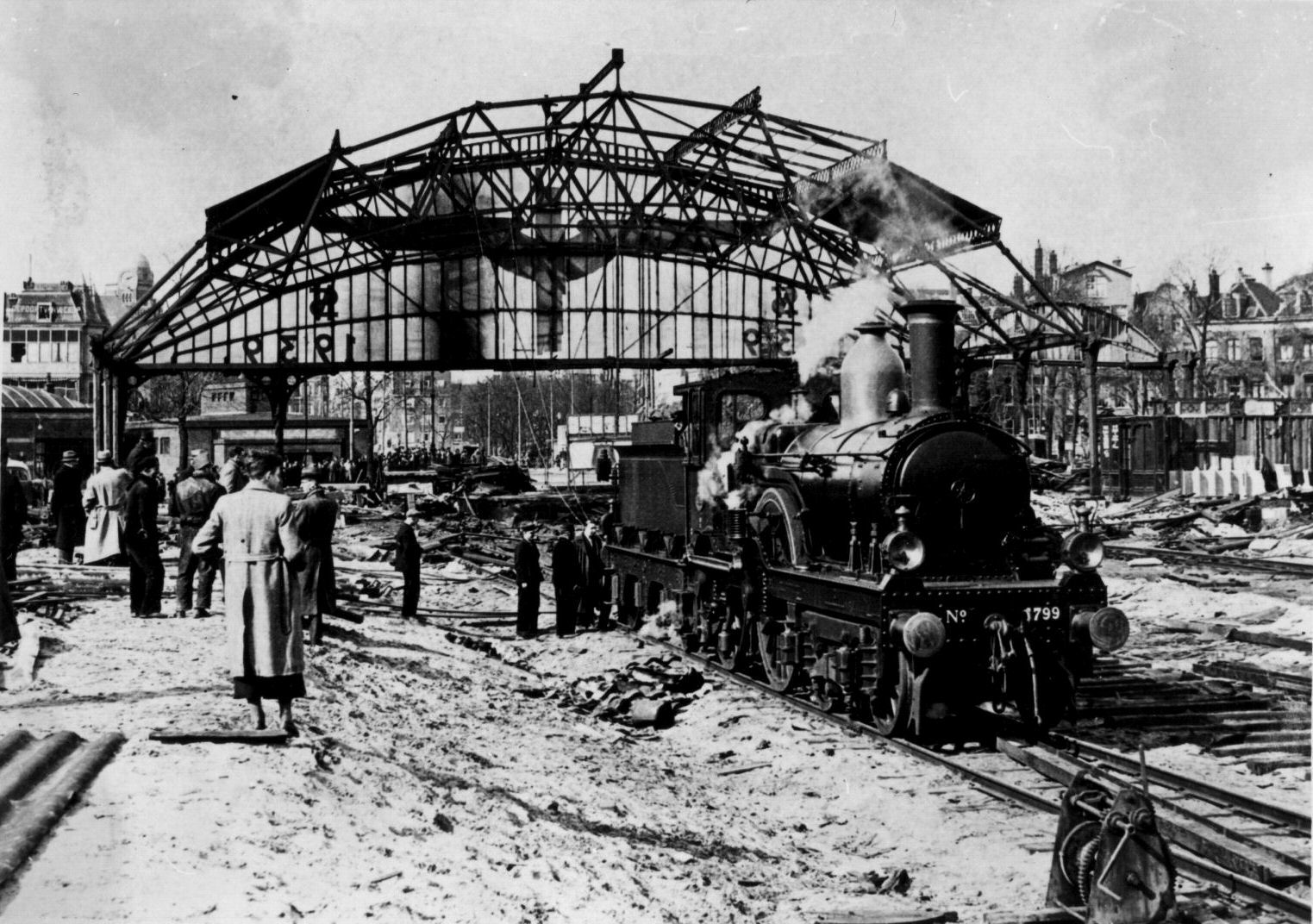
NS 1799 at the demolition of Amsterdam Weesperpoort. (1939)

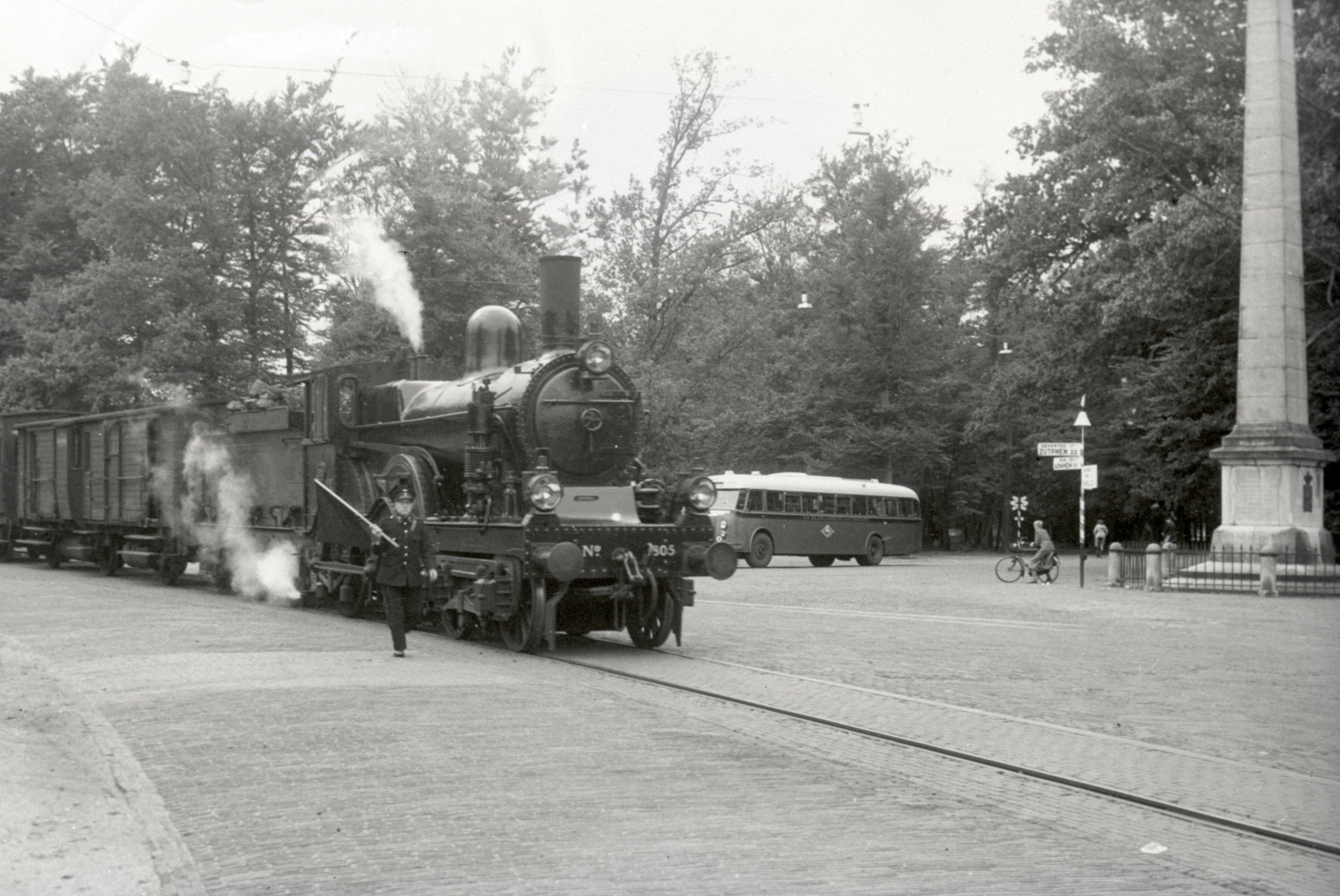
NS 1805 with a train at the road junction at the memorial needle at Het Loo in Apeldoorn. (1950)

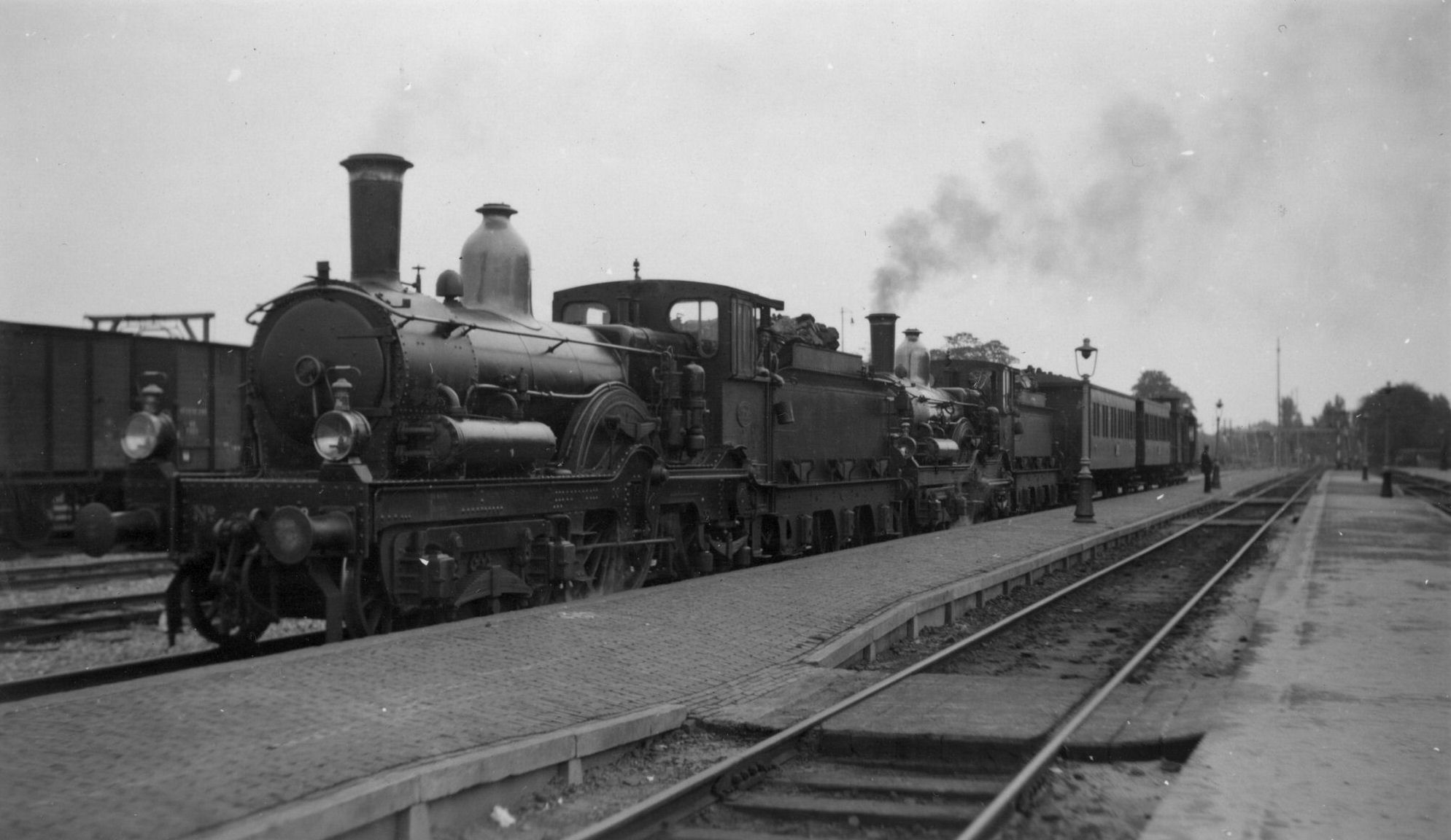
NS 1708 and NS 1798 with a train to Alkmaar at Hoorn station. (13-03-1938)

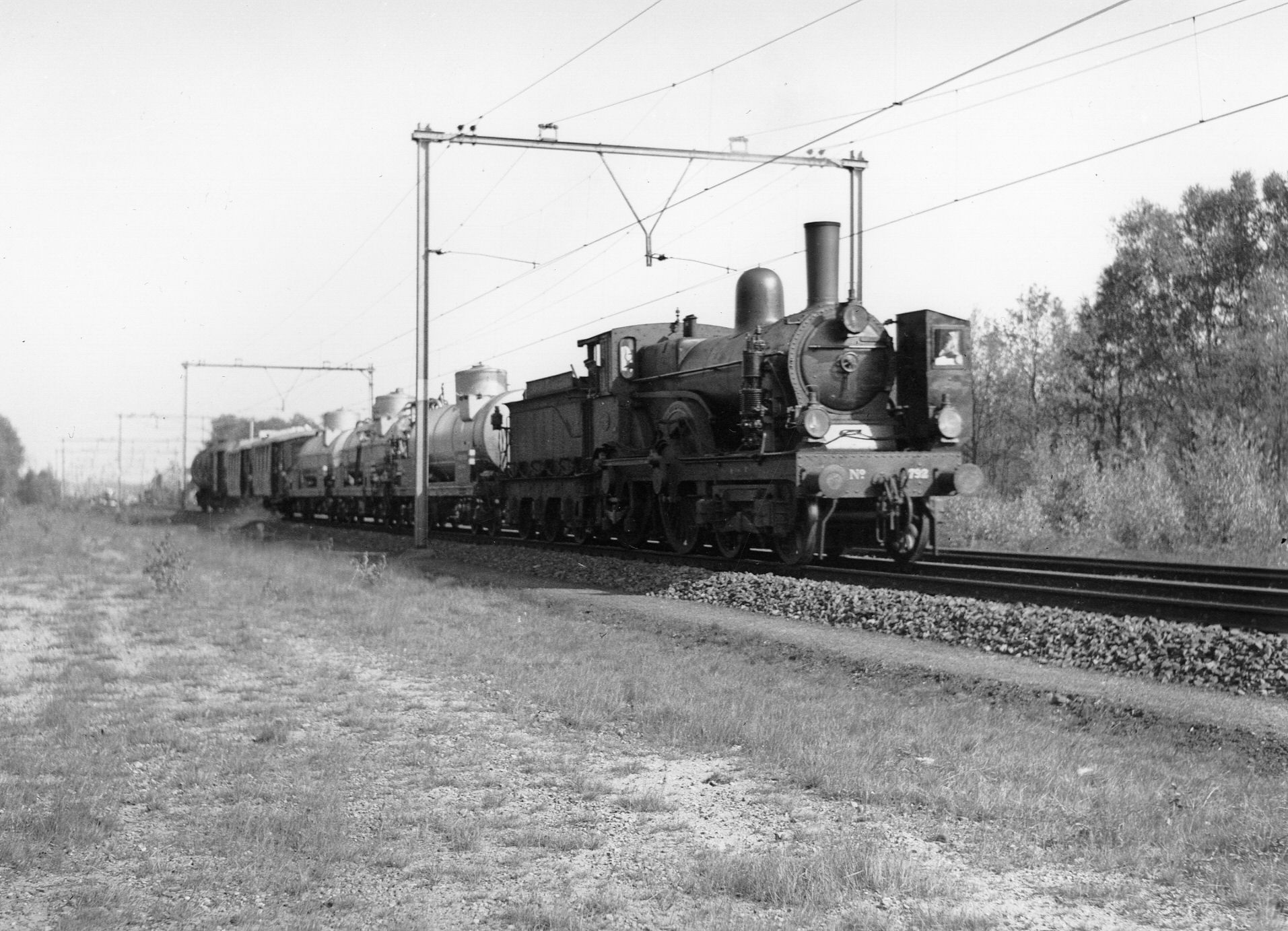
NS 1792 with the spray train (weed kill train) probably in the vicinity of Utrecht. (04-05-1953)

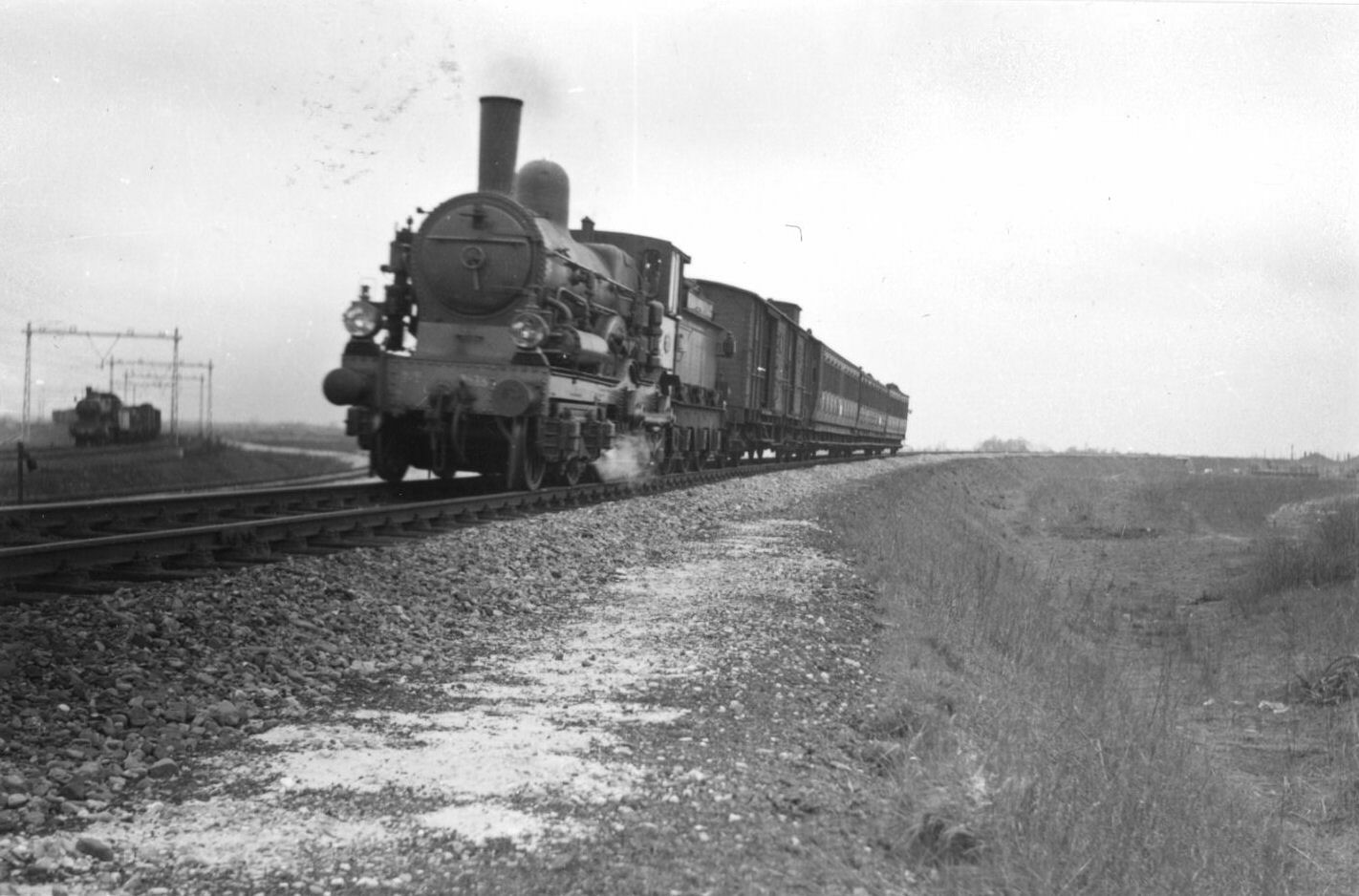
Presumably NS 1775 with a passenger train from Mariënberg in Almelo, near the connection with the Deventer-Almelo line. (1953)

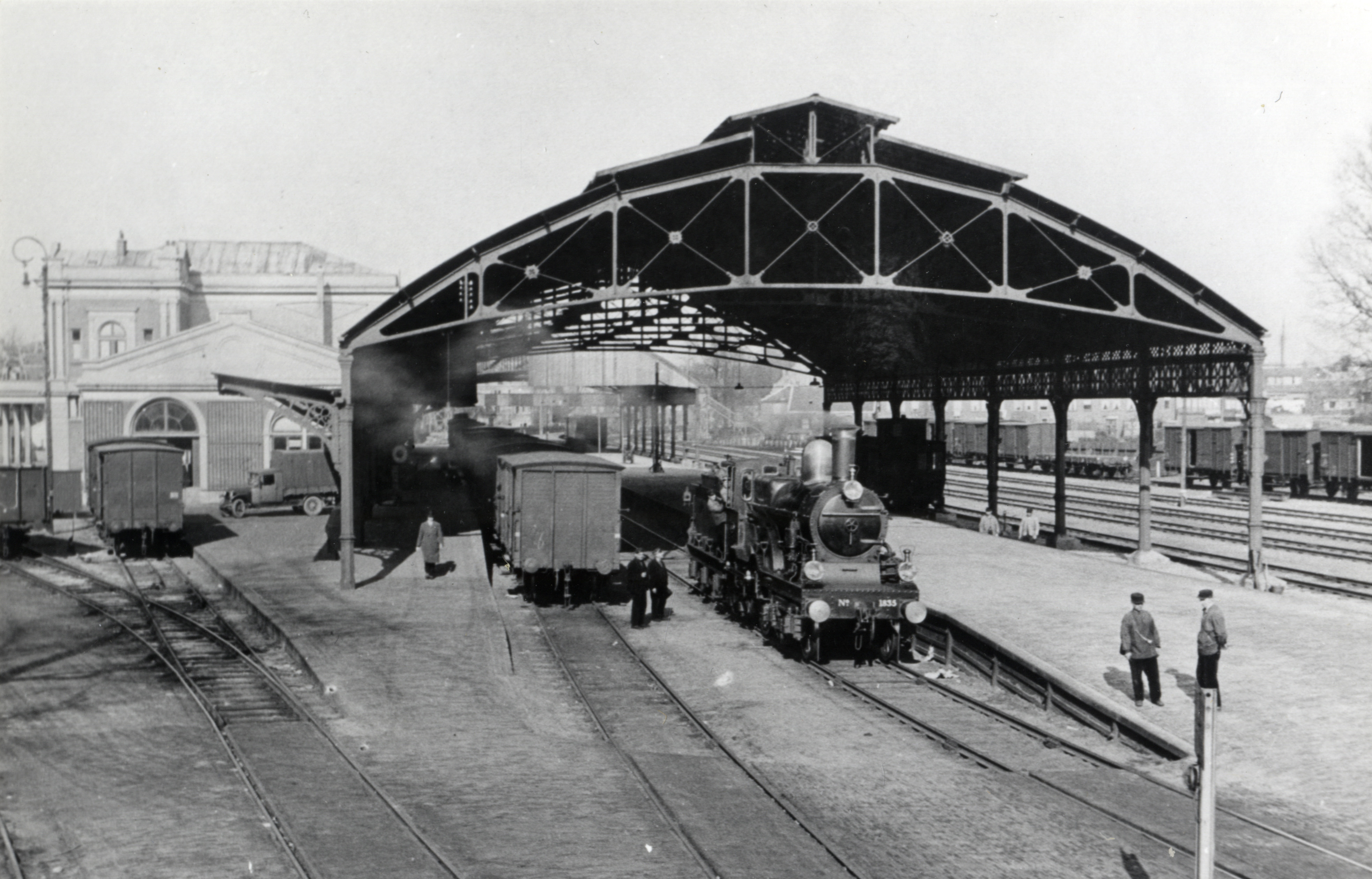
NS 1835 at Utrecht Maliebaan station. (1930 - 1938) (Now the site of the Dutch railway museum)

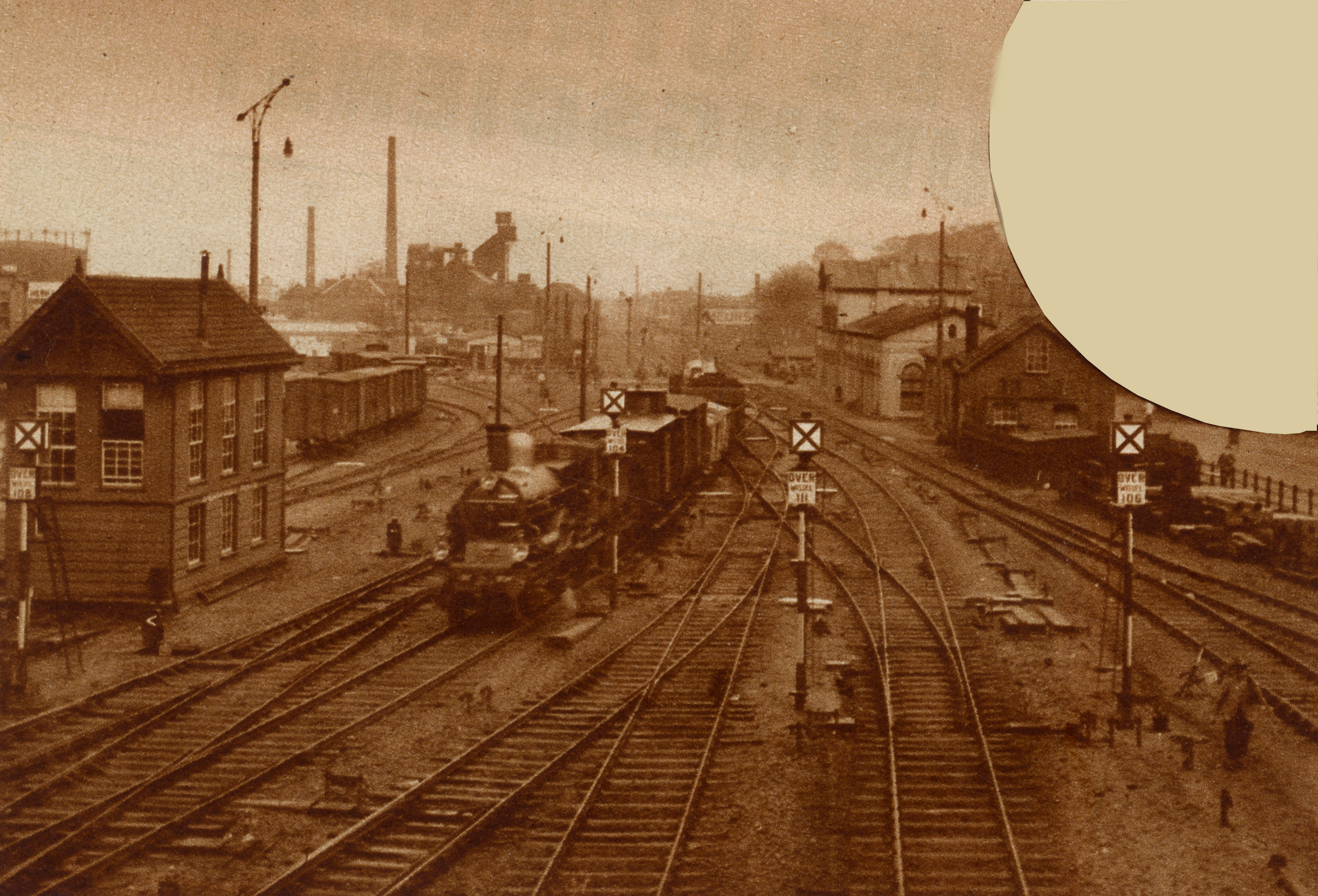
A locomotive of the series 1700 at the yard of Amersfoort station. (1925 - 1930)

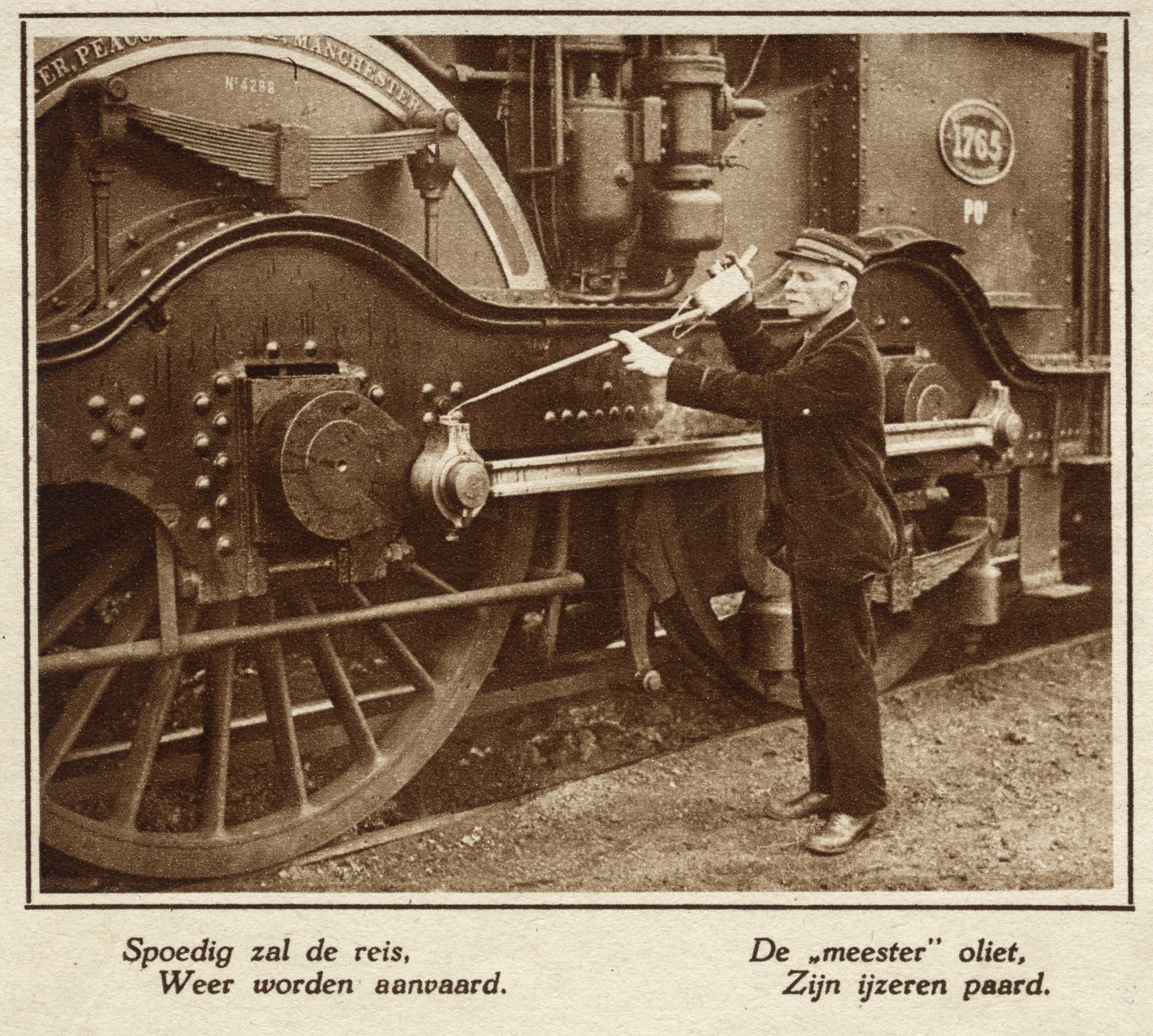
The driver lubricating the connecting rod of the NS 1765, at Utrecht CS. (1929)

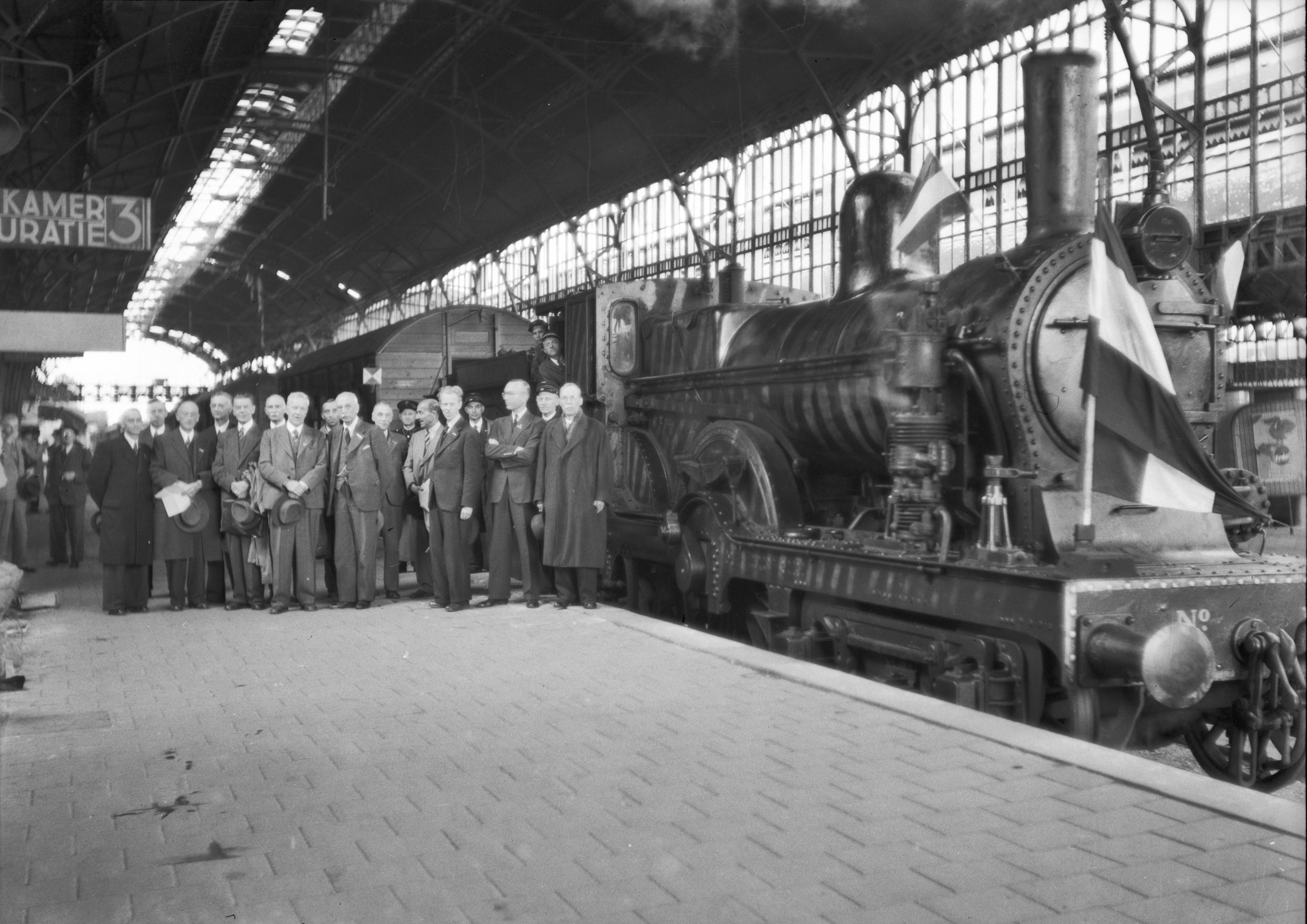
NS 1752 with the management of the NS at the first train after the war. (May 1945)

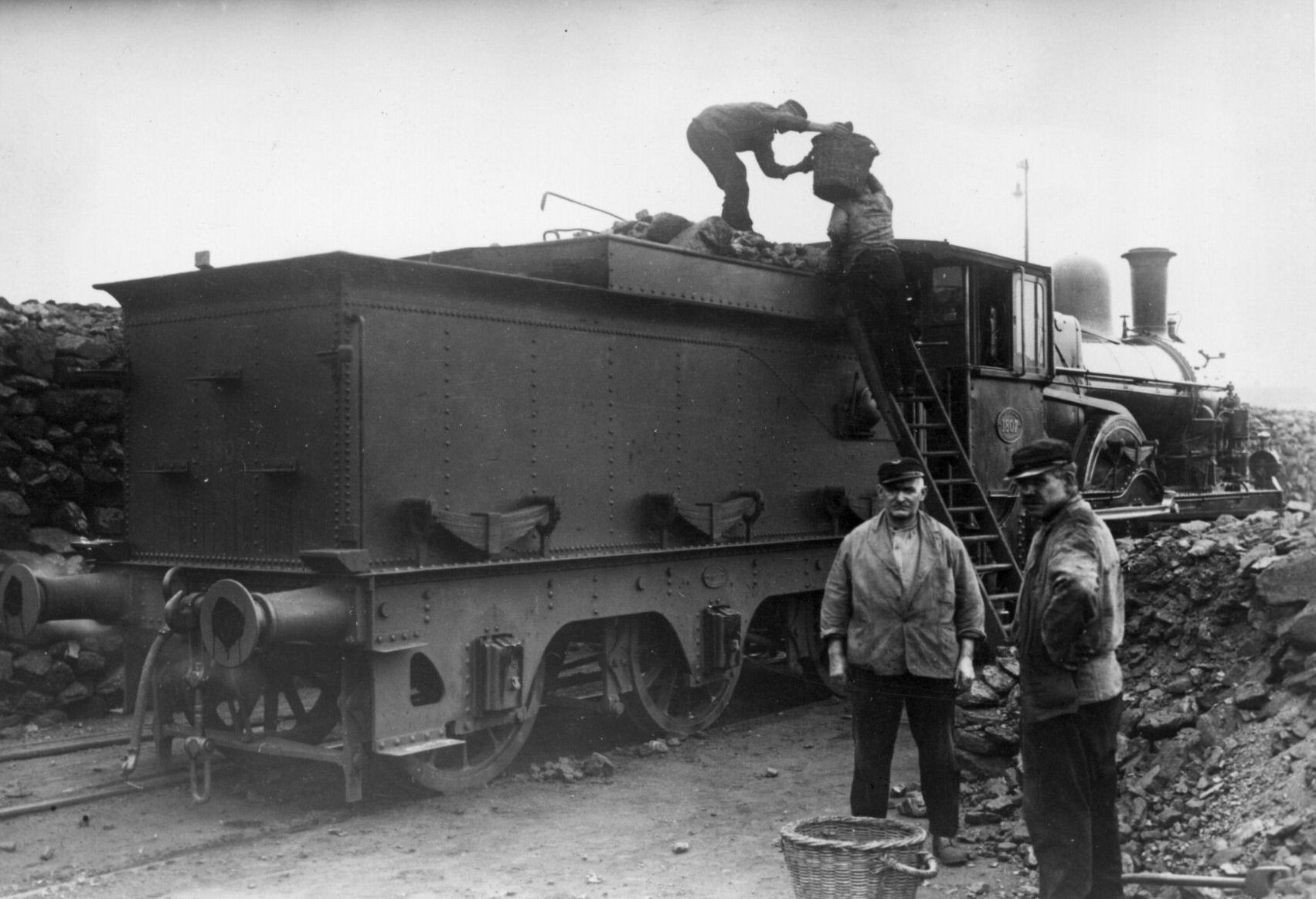
NS 1807 being coaled. (1920 - 1935)

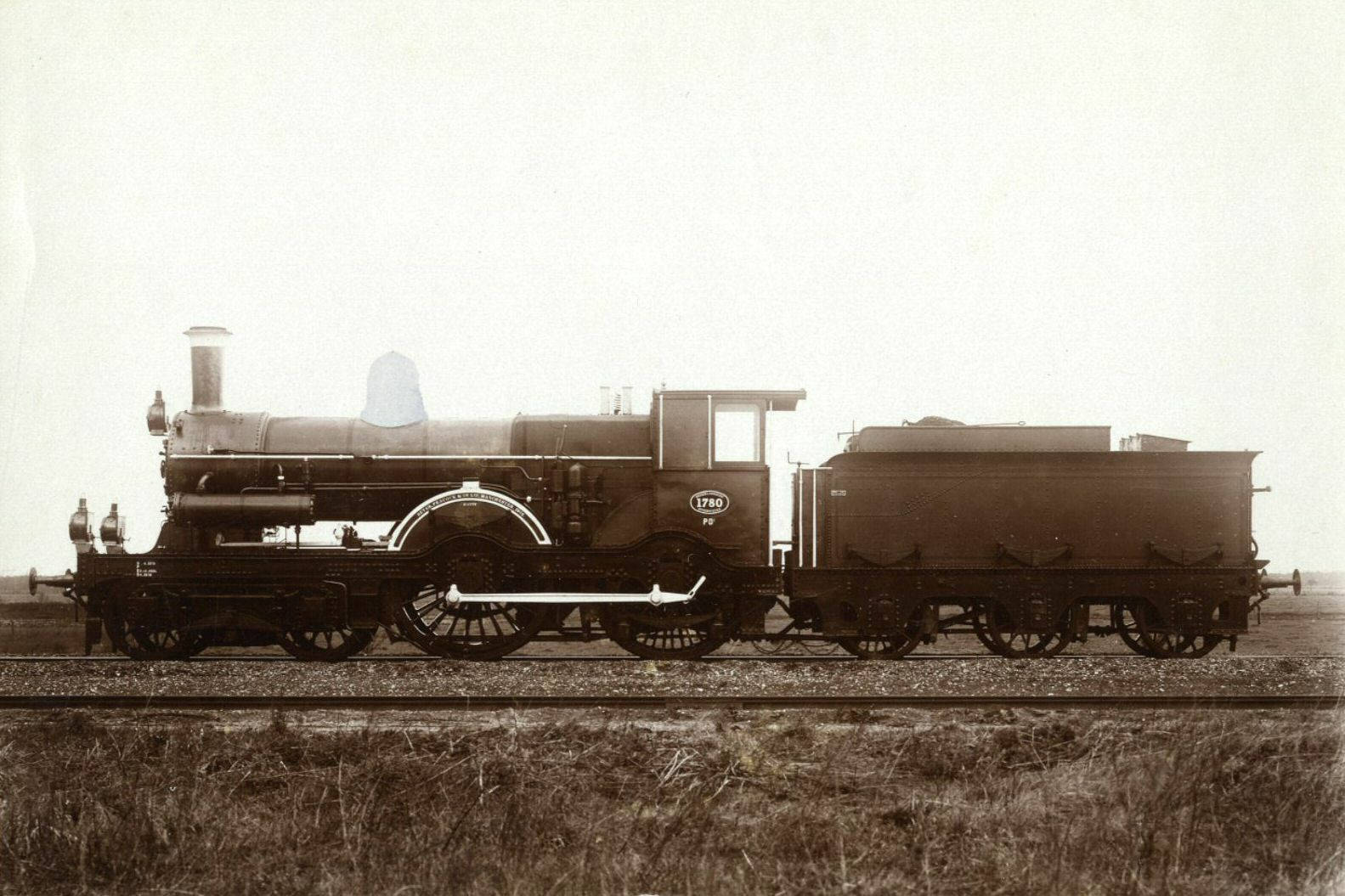

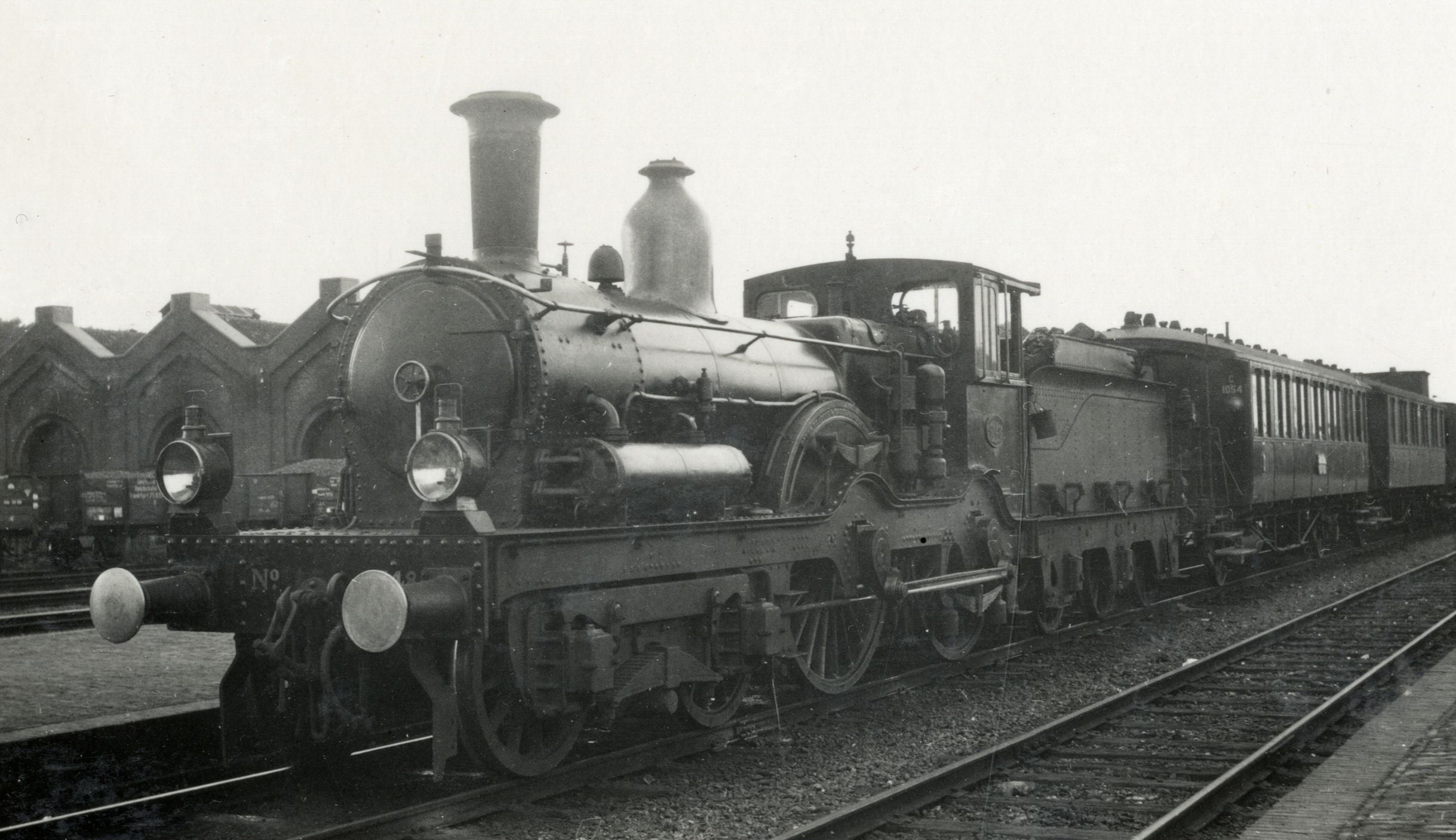
NS 1748 with a train to Gennep at Boxtrel station. (1930 - 1940)

== Sources and references ==
- Het Utrecht Archief
