= NS 3600 =

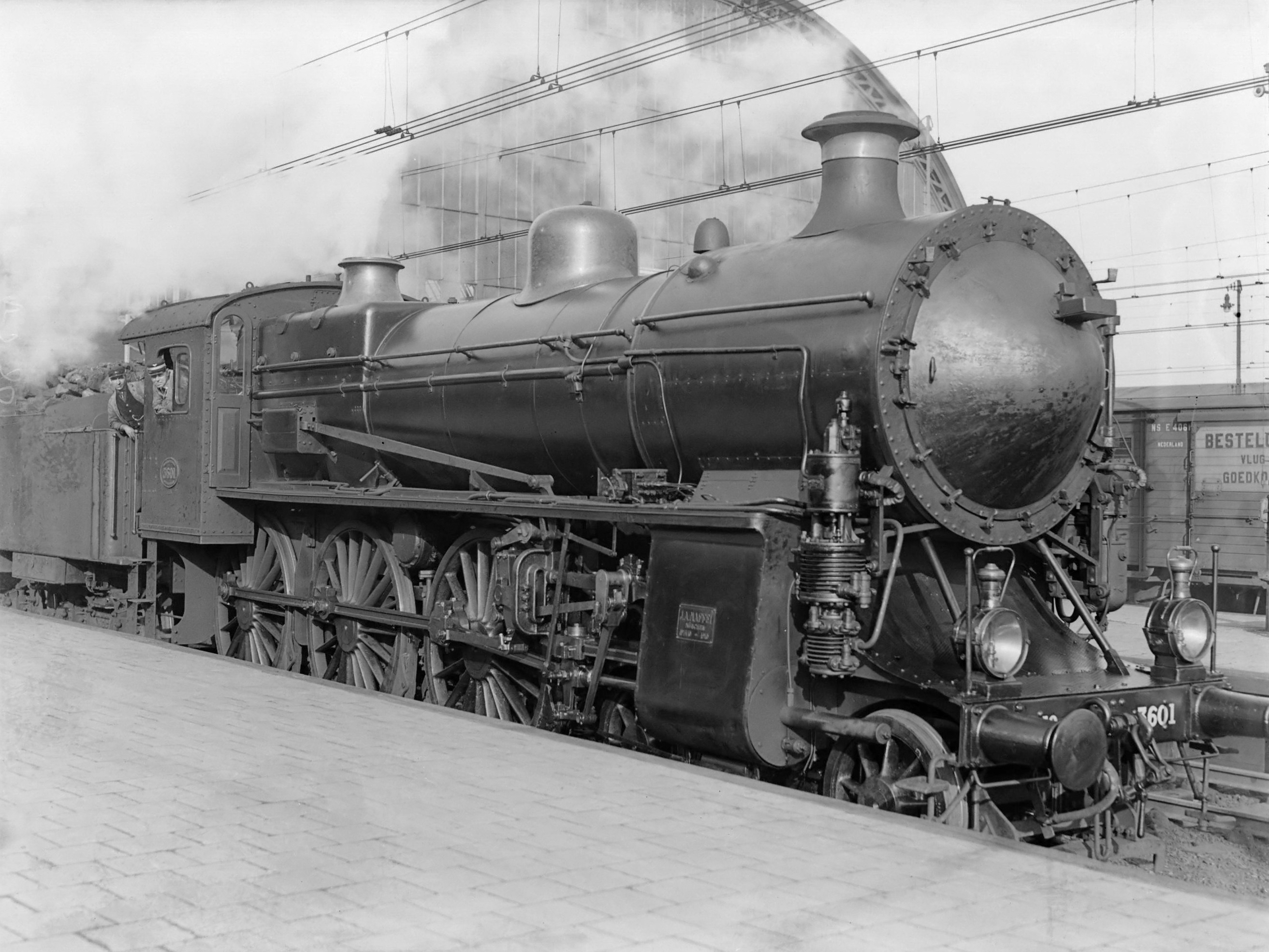
Type and origin
- Power type: Steam
- Builder: Maffei
- Build date: 1910–1914
- Total produced: 8
Specifications
- Configuration
  - Whyte: 4-6-0
  - UIC: 2′C h4
- Gauge: 1,435 mm (4 ft 8 1/2 in)
- Leading dia.: Original: 1,000 mm (3 ft 3 in), Rebuild: 930 mm (3 ft 1 in)
- Driver dia.: 1,900 mm (6 ft 3 in)
- Tender wheels: Original: 1,000 mm (3 ft 3 in), Rebuild: 1,100 mm (3 ft 7 in)
- Length: Original: 19,867 mm (65 ft 2.2 in), Rebuild: 20,034 mm (65 ft 8.7 in)
- Height: 4,600 mm (15 ft 1 in)
- Loco weight: Original: 70 t (77 short tons; 69 long tons), Rebuild: 76 t (84 short tons; 75 long tons)
- Tender weight: Original: 48.3 t (53.2 short tons; 47.5 long tons), Rebuild: 63 t (69 short tons; 62 long tons)
- Fuel type: Coal
- Fuel capacity: Original: 5 t (5.5 short tons; 4.9 long tons), New tender: 6 t (6.6 short tons; 5.9 long tons)
- Water cap.: Original: 20 m^{3} (4,400 imp gal), New tender: 28 m^{3} (6,200 imp gal)
- Firebox
  - Grate area: Original: 3.44 m^{2} (37.0 sq ft), Rebuild: 2.84 m^{2} (30.6 sq ft)
- Boiler pressure: 12 kg/cm^{2} (170 psi)
- Heating surface
  - Firebox: Original: 16 m^{2} (170 sq ft), Rebuild: 15 m^{2} (160 sq ft)
  - Tubes: Original: 140 m^{2} (1,500 sq ft), Rebuild: 130 m^{2} (1,400 sq ft)
- Superheater
  - Heating area: Original: 83.5 m^{2} (899 sq ft), Rebuild: 41 m^{2} (440 sq ft)
- Cylinders: 4
- Cylinder size: 400 mm × 640 mm (15 3/4 in × 25 3/16 in)
- Valve gear: Walschaerts
Performance figures
- Maximum speed: Original: 90 km/h (56 mph), Rebuild: 110 km/h (68 mph)
- Tractive effort: Original: 9,250 kgf (20,400 lbf), Rebuild: 9,050 kgf (20,000 lbf)
Career
- Operators: NCS, SS, NS
- Power class: NS: PO^{3}
- Nicknames: Zeppelins
- Withdrawn: 1947–1953
- Preserved: None, all scrapped

The NS 3600 was a series of express steam locomotives of the Dutch Railways (NS) and its predecessors Maatschappij tot Exploitatie van Staatsspoorwegen (SS) and Nederlandsche Centraal-Spoorweg-Maatschappij (NCS).

== History ==
The first two locomotives, Nos. 71 and 72, were delivered in 1910, and Nos. 73 to 78 followed in 1911 to 1914. 73–78 did not have a fully streamlined cab, and 75–78 also had slightly different tenders. Because of their conical shaped smokebox door, these locomotives soon got the nickname 'Zeppelins'.

In 1919, the operation of the NCS was taken over by the SS, with these locomotives being included in the SS numbering as 971–978. When the locomotives and rolling stock of the SS and the HSM was merged in 1921, the locomotives of this series were given the NS numbers 3601–3608. In 1925, these locomotives were rebuilt with a boiler that was practically the same as that of the series NS 3700, because of the wider Belpaire firebox the cab lost its streamlined shape. In 1935 the locomotives had brakes fitted on the bogie, and they received a fully welded tender that had the same water and coal capacity as the tender of the series NS 3900. The maximum speed could therefore be increased to 110 km/h (68 mph). The last locomotive of this series was withdrawn from service in 1953. No engine has survived into preservation.

== Fleet list ==
Works No.	Built date	NCS number	SS number	NS number	Withdrawn	Notes
3140	1910	71	971	3601	1951	
3141	1910	72	972	3602	1947	Taken during the war to Germany, after the locomotive had returned it was scrapped due to war damage.
3276	1911	73	973	3603	1953	Taken to Germany during the war, repaired after being returned
3277	1911	74	974	3604	1952	
3404	1913	75	975	3605	1957	Taken to Germany during the war, reported missing in 1950. Scrapped in the DDR in 1957.
3405	1913	76	976	3606	1947	Taken to Germany during the war, scrapped due to war damage after being returned
3406	1914	77	977	3607	1952	Taken to Germany during the war, repaired after being returned
3413	1914	78	978	3608	1947	Taken to Germany during the war, scrapped due to war damage after being returned.

== Gallery ==
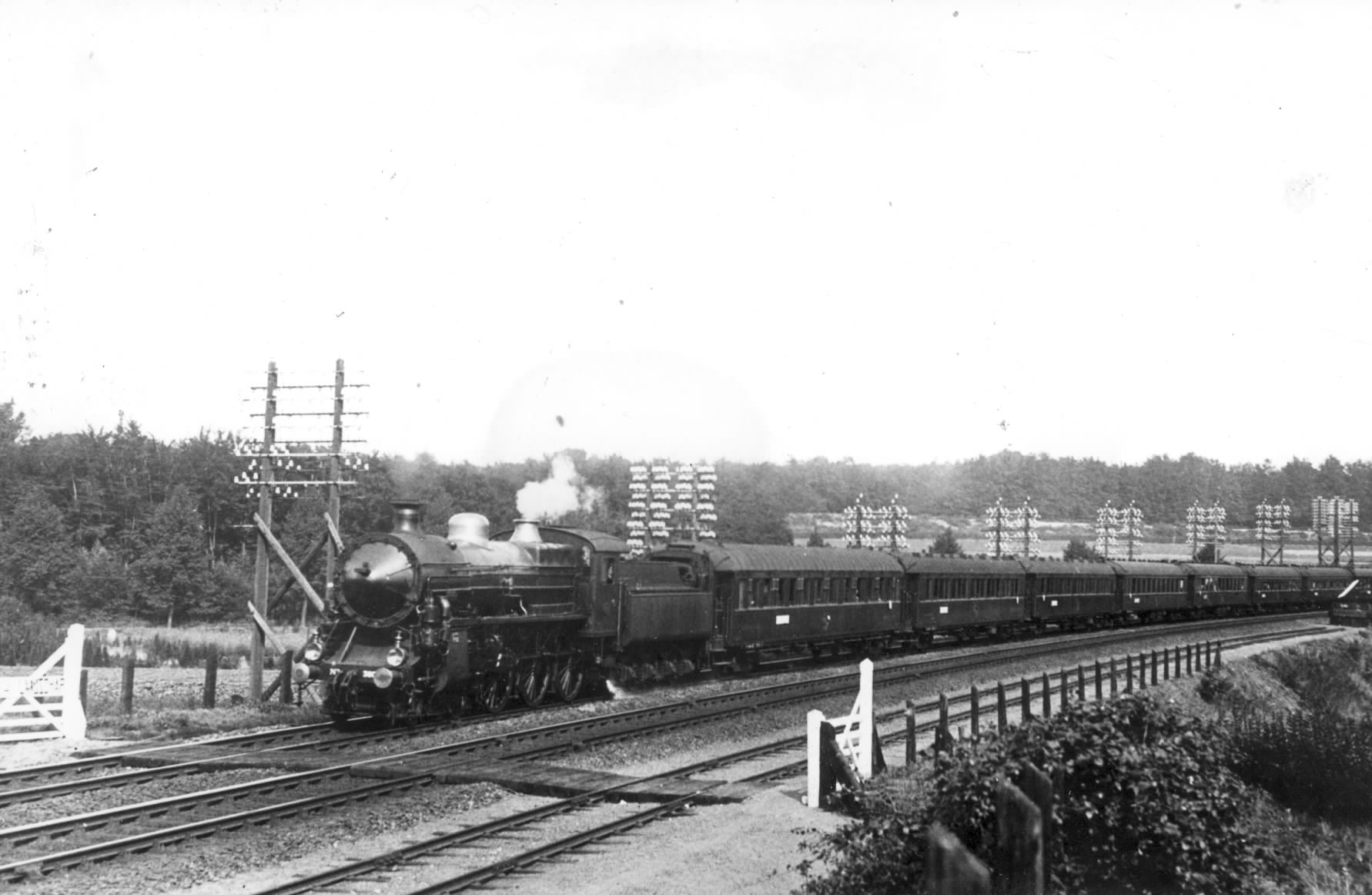
An NS 3600 with international coaches as a D train near Oosterbeek Laag. (08-08-1939)

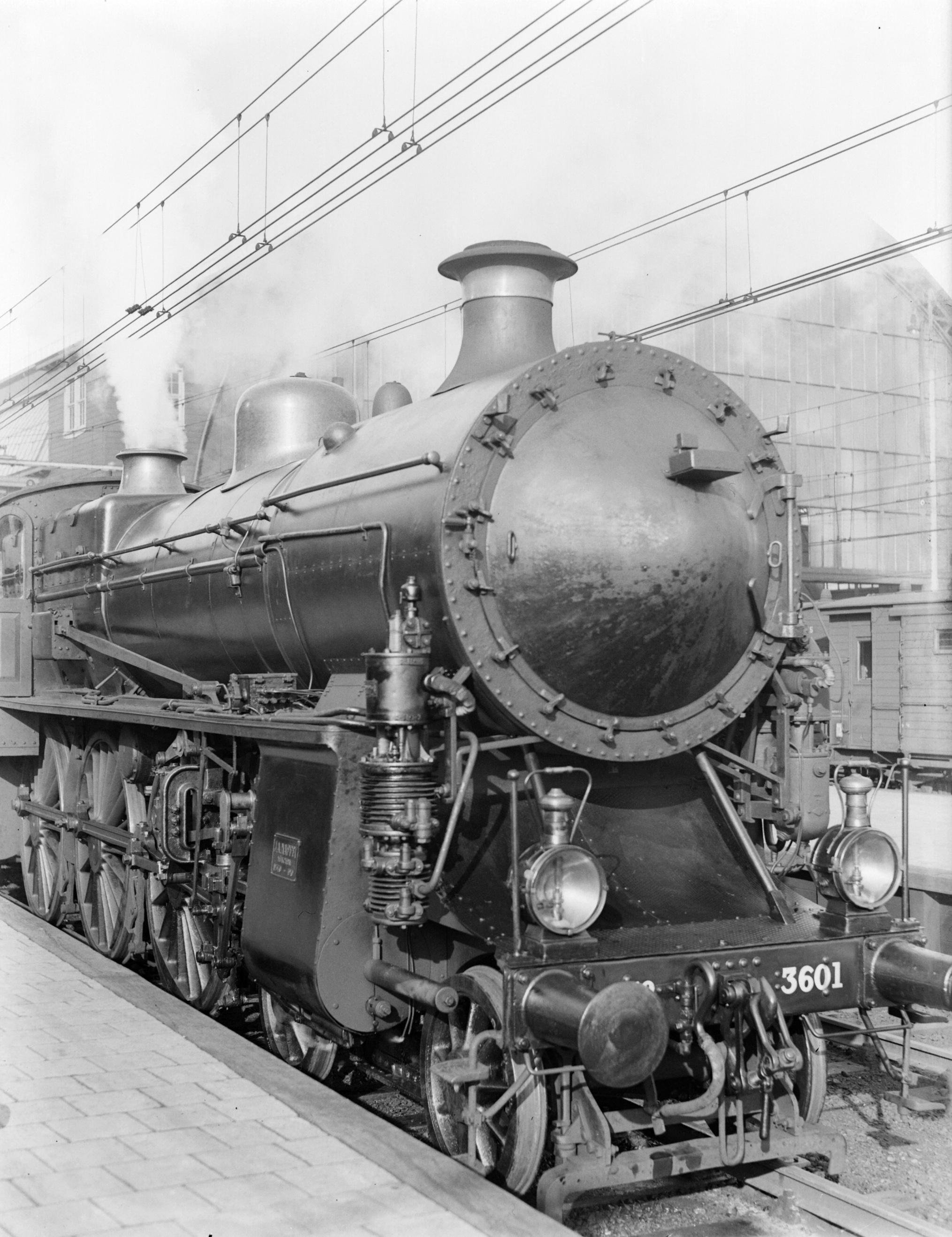
NS 3604 at Amsterdam CS. (1932)

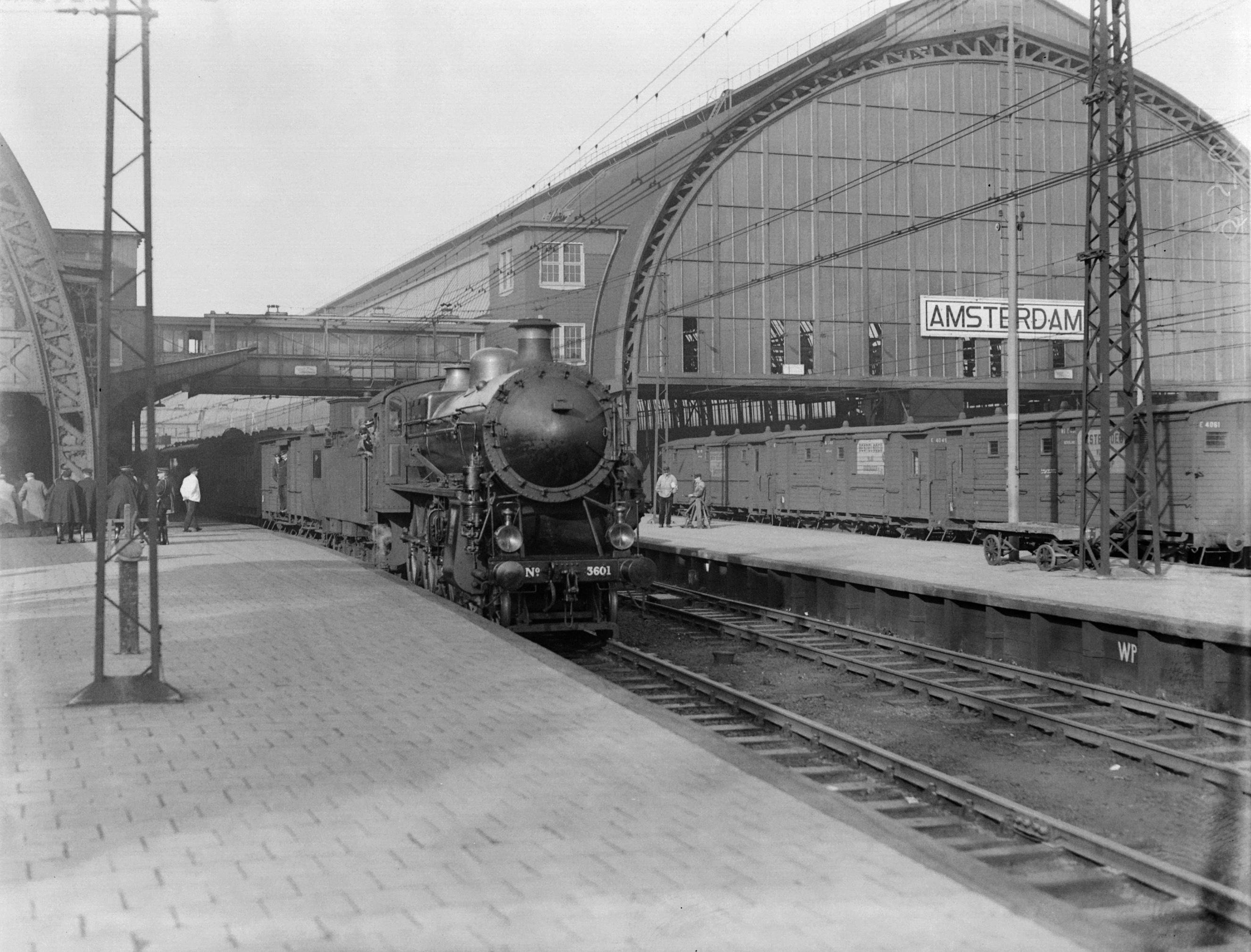
NS 3601 with wagons along the platform of Amsterdam Central. (1932)

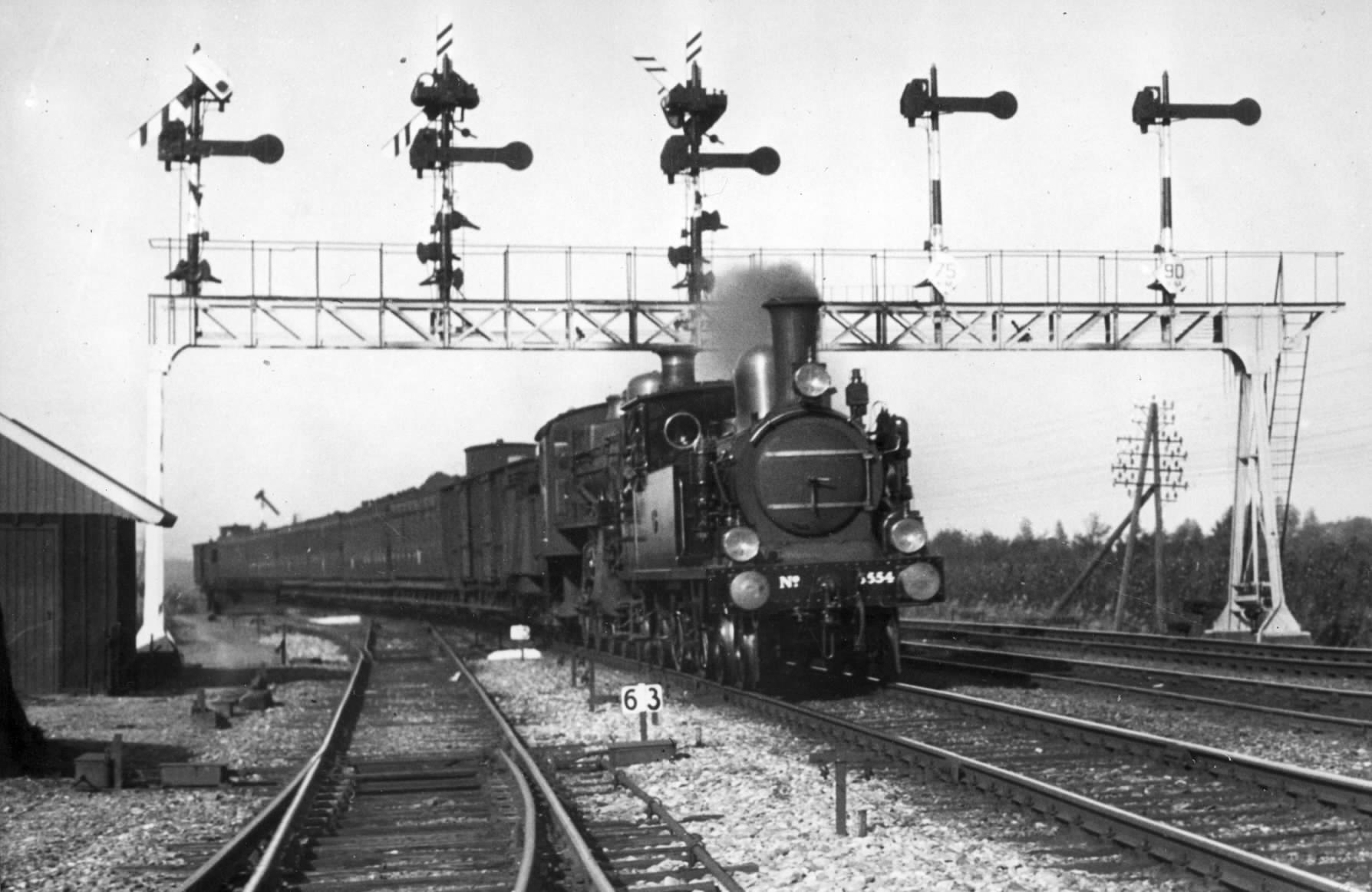
An NS 3600 behind NS 5554 with coaches under the signal gantry near Naarden-Bussum. (June 1936)

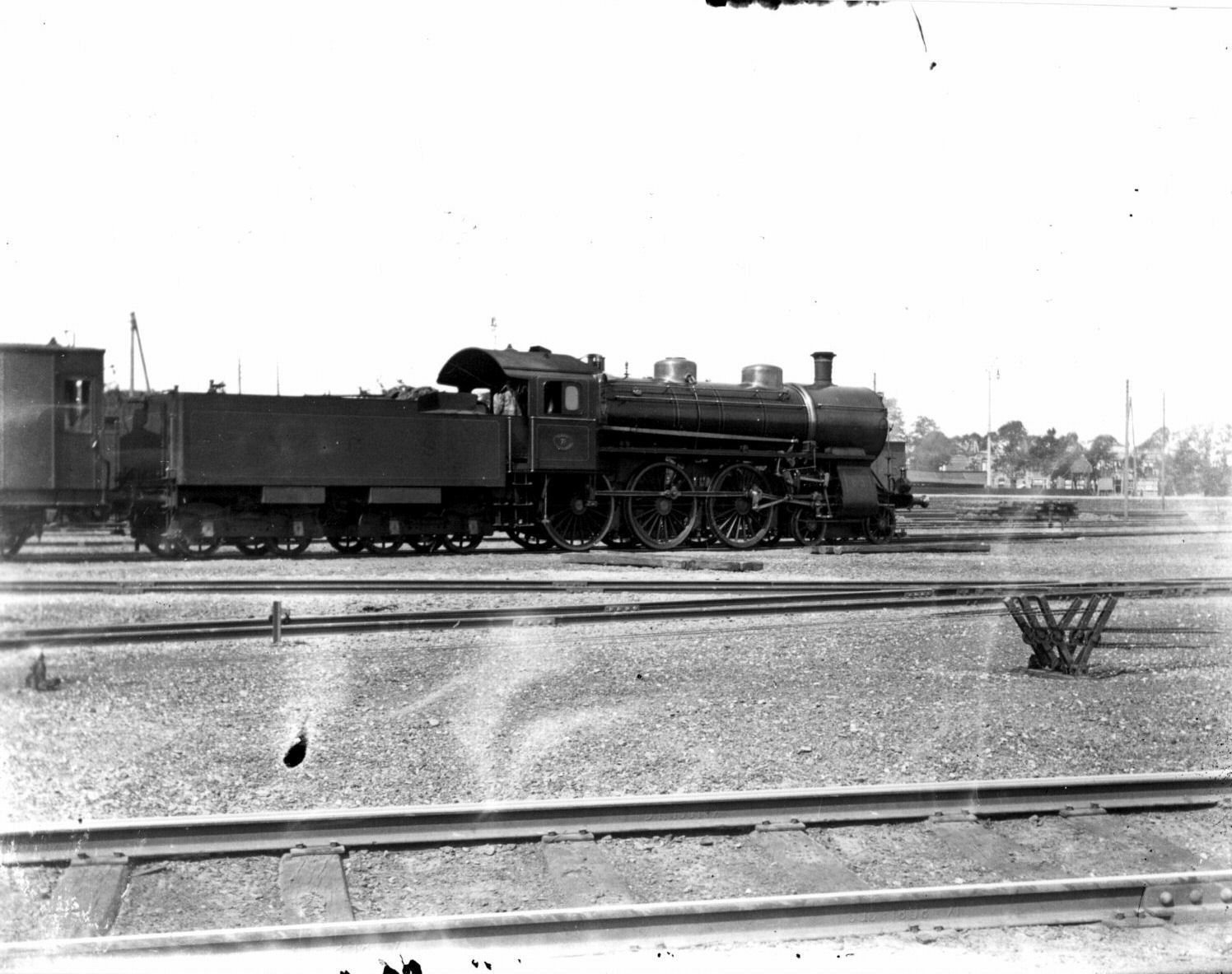
NS 3601. (Between 1910 - 1920)

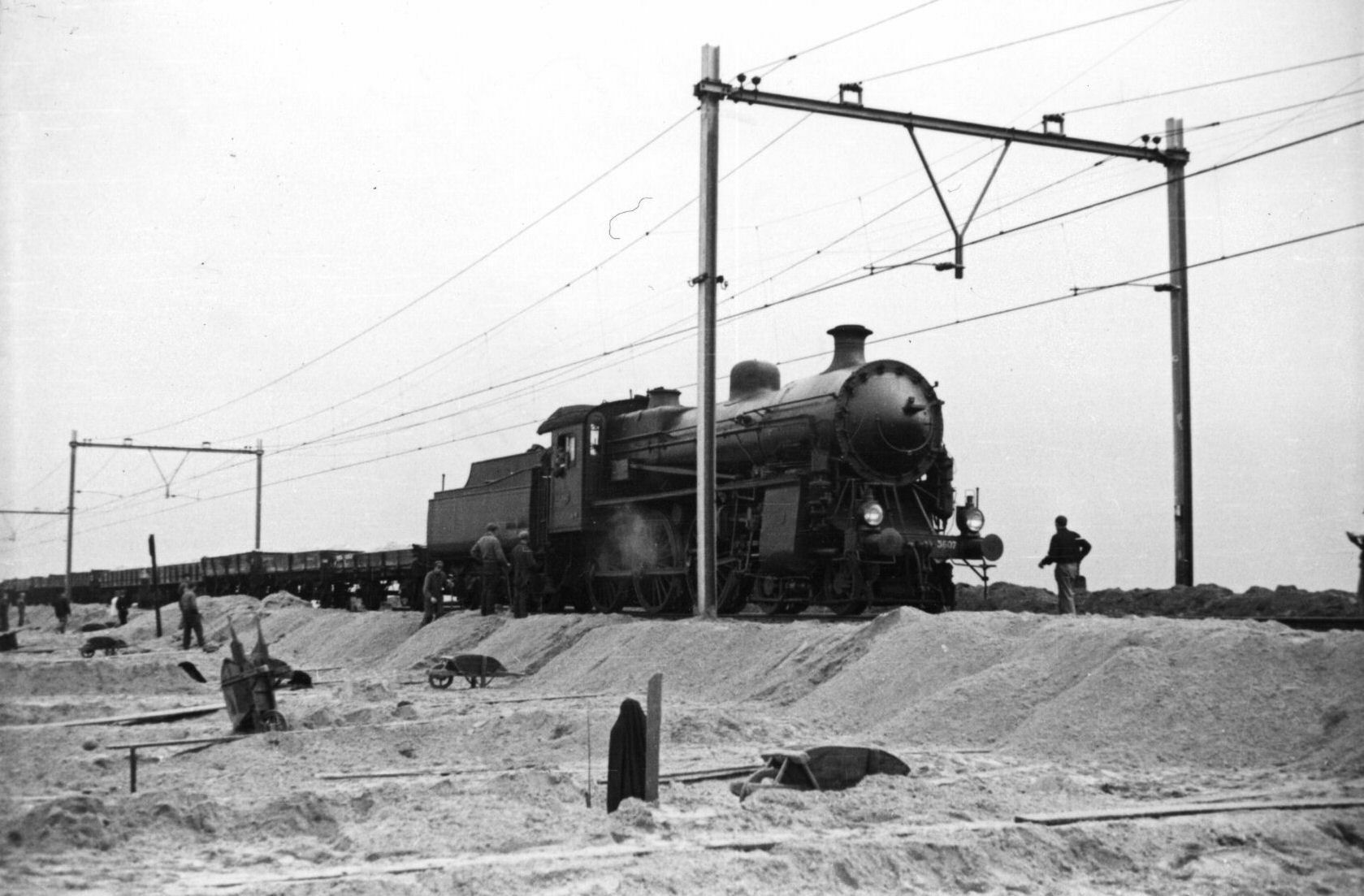
NS 3607 with a sand train, presumably during the work on the railway embankment between Gouda and Oudewater. (1947)

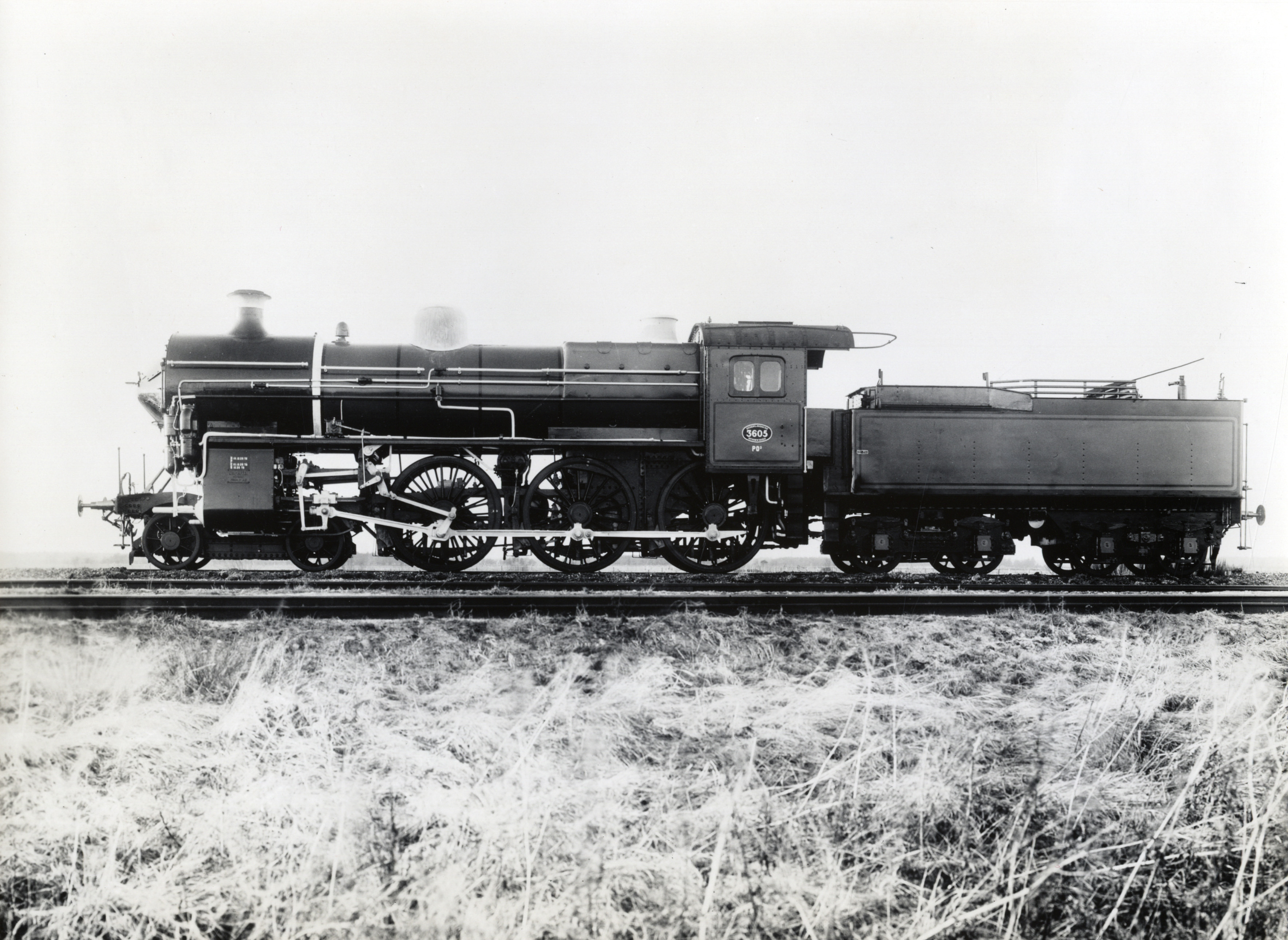
NS 3605. (Between 1925 - 1930)

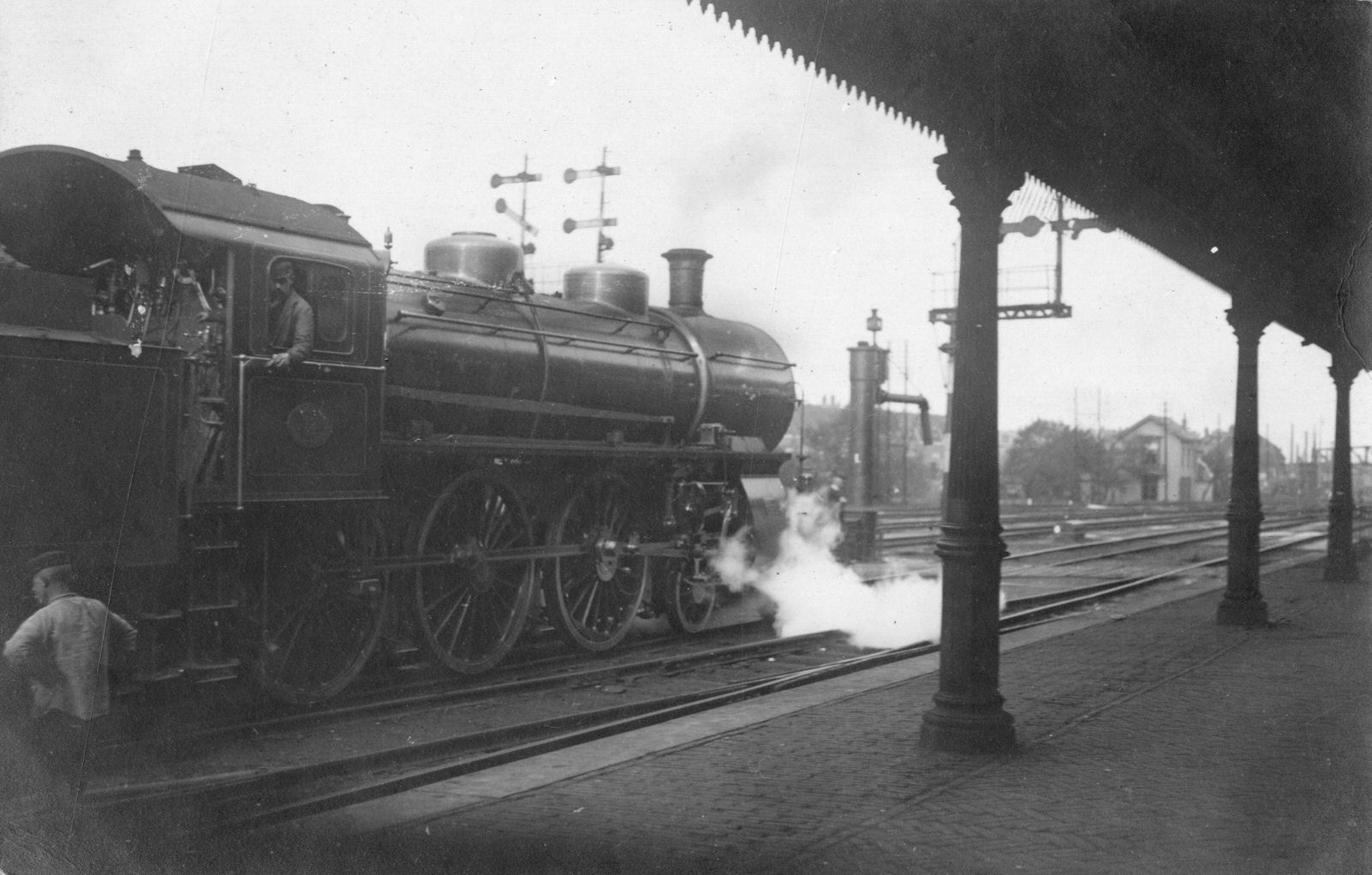
NS 3602 / NCS 72 in Utrecht. (Between 1910 - 1920)

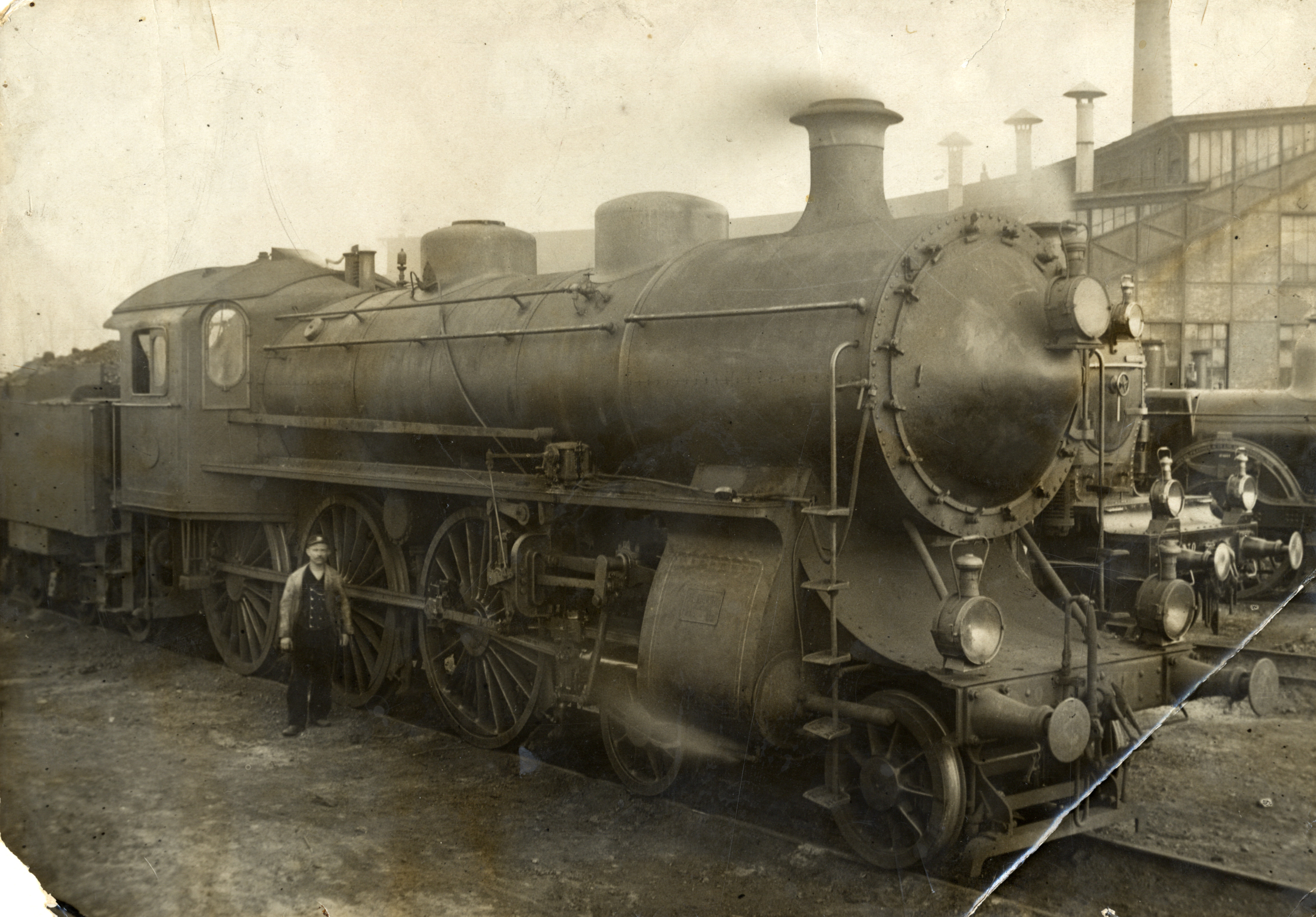
NS 3603 / NCS 73 presumably in Roosendaal. (Between 1920 - 1930)

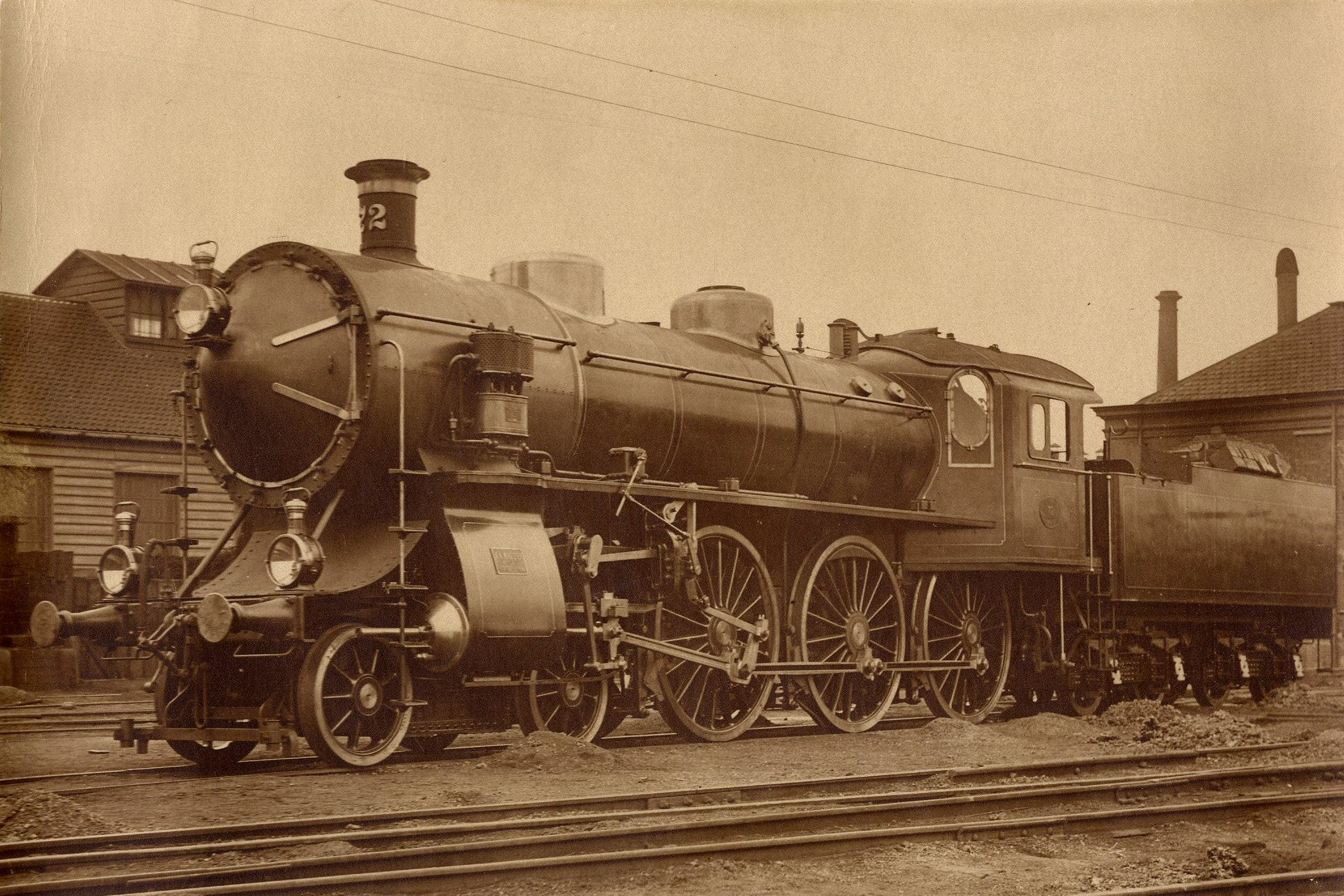
NS 3602 / NCS 72 in Utrecht. (1910)

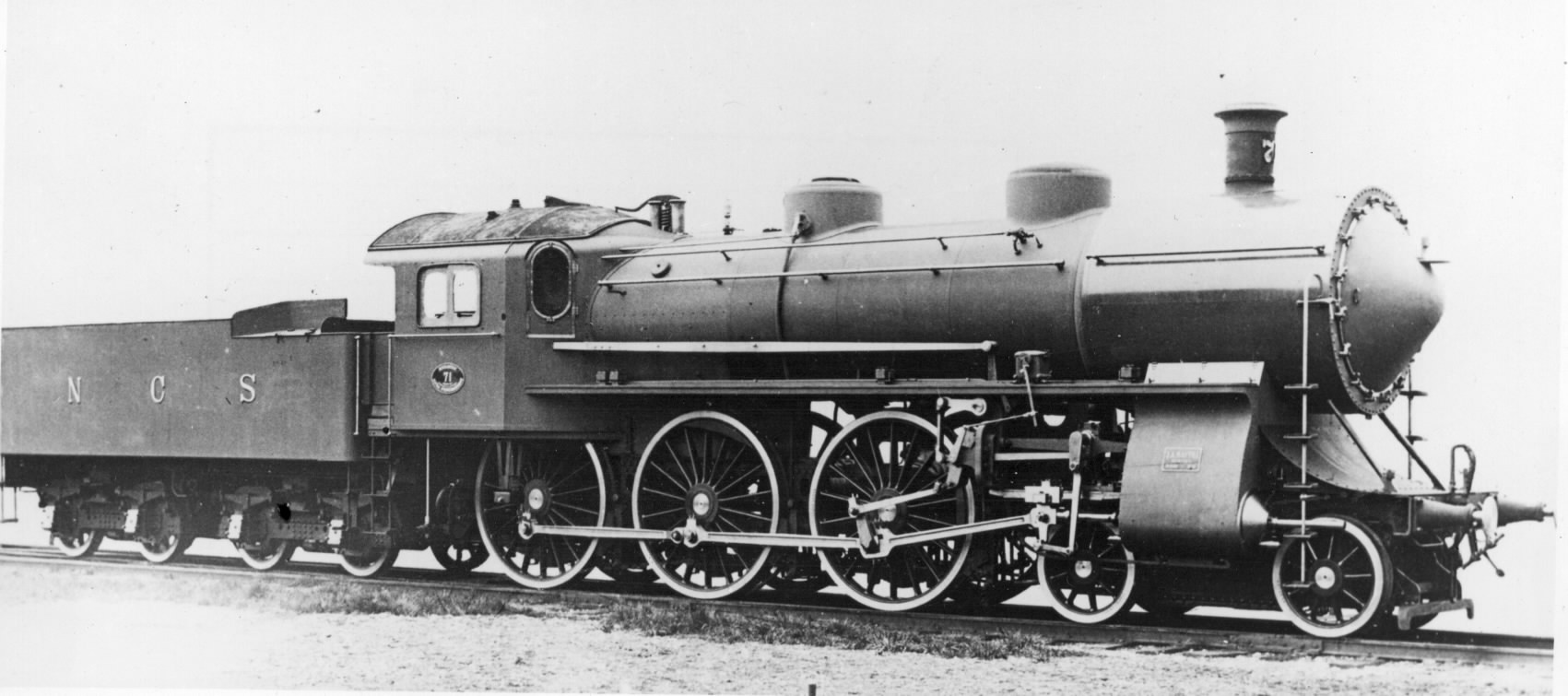
NS 3601 / NCS 71 (Between 1910 - 1925)

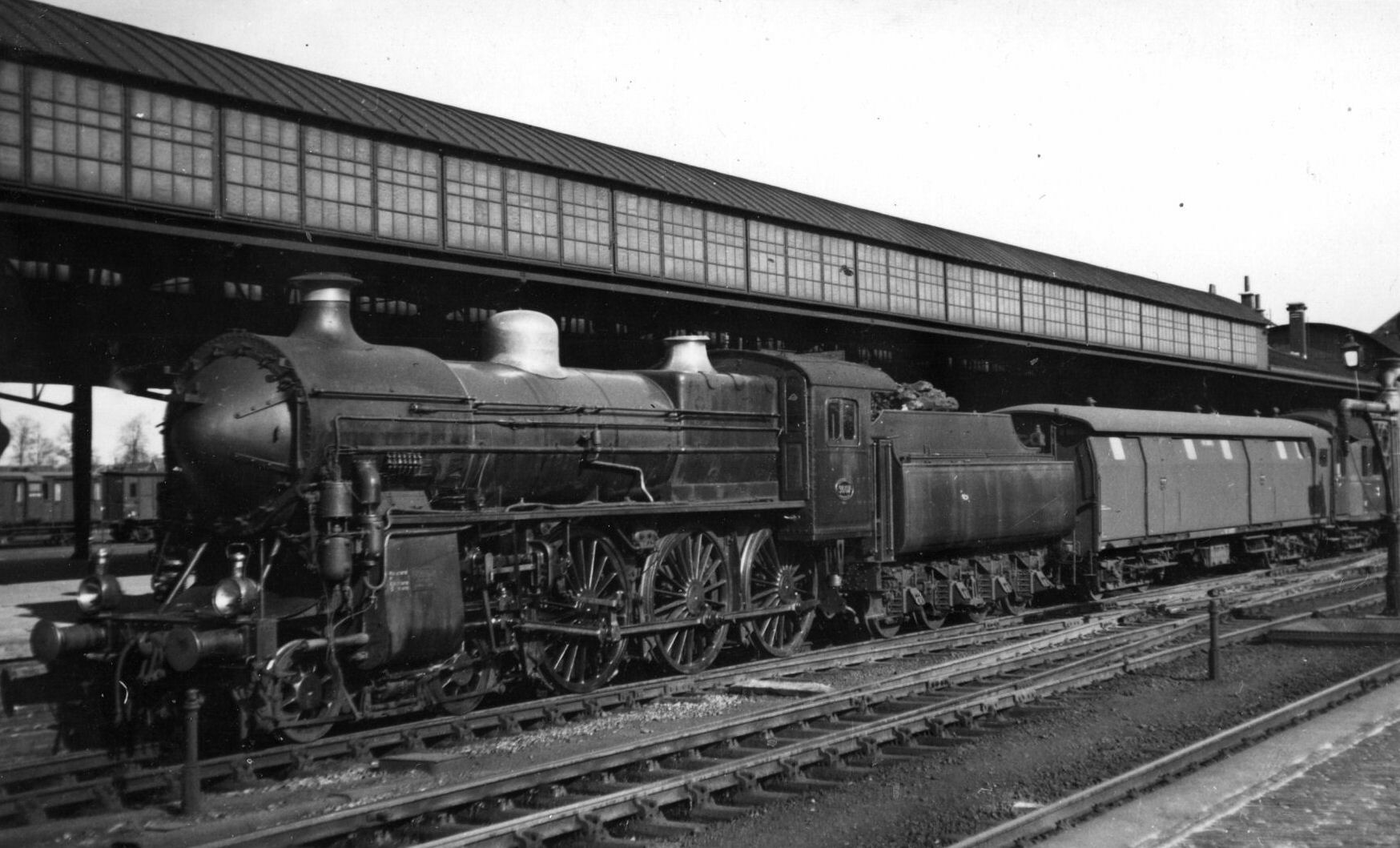
NS 3607 with train 384 at Amersfoort station. (March 1937)

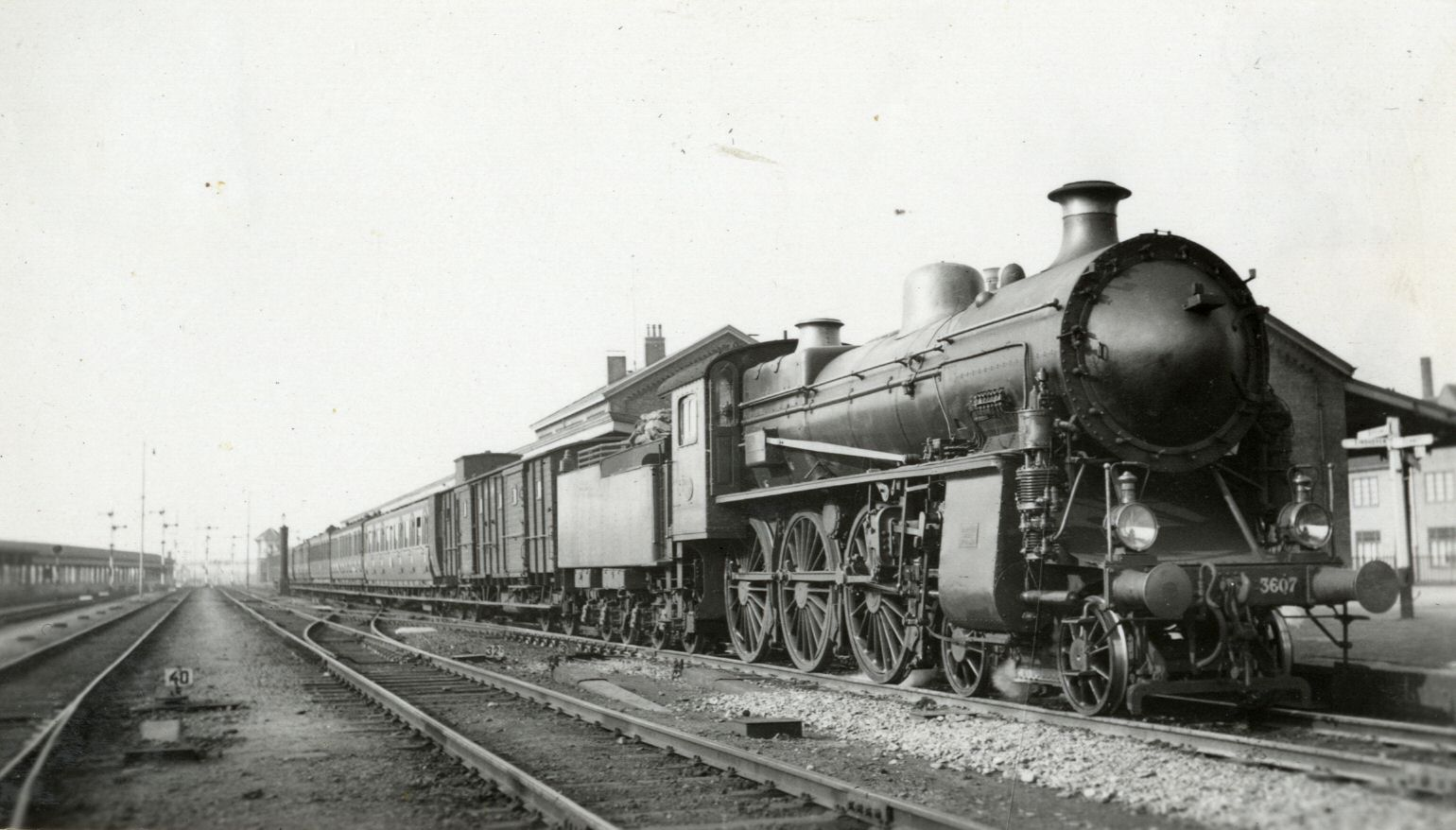
NS 3607 at Boxtel station (1925)

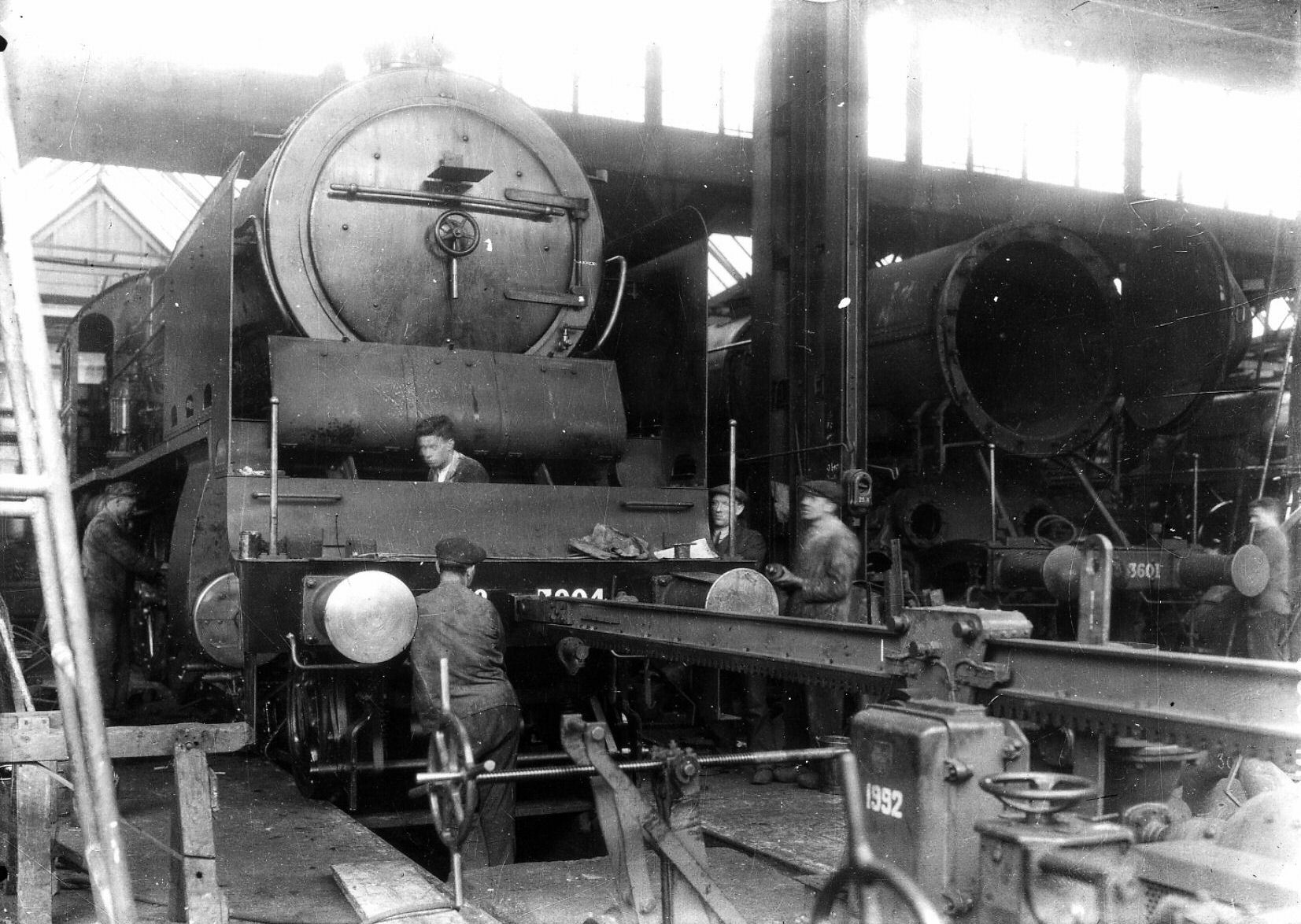
NS 3904 on the left and NS 3601 on the right in the workshop in Tilburg. (June 1933)

== Sources ==
- N. J. van Wijck Jurriaanse: De Nederlandsche Centraal Spoorwegmaatschappij. Uitg. Wyt, Rotterdam, 1973. ISBN 90-6007-527-7
- H. Waldorp: Onze Nederlandse stoomlocomotieven in woord en beeld, 5e geheel herziene druk. Uitg. De Alk, Alkmaar, 1981. ISBN 90-6013-909-7.
- R.C. Statius Muller, A.J. Veenendaal jr., H. Waldorp: De Nederlandse stoomlocomotieven. Uitg. De Alk, Alkmaar, 2005. ISBN 90-6013-262-9.
- A. Weijts: Tussen vuur en stoom. Uitg. Europese Bibliotheek, Zaltbommel, 2001. ISBN 90-288-2694-7.
- Martin van Oostrom: Stoomlocomotieven NCS serie 71-78 (NS 3600). Uitg. Uquilair, Rosmalen, 1988. ISBN 90-71513-03-3.
- Het Utrechts Archief
