= NS 3900 =

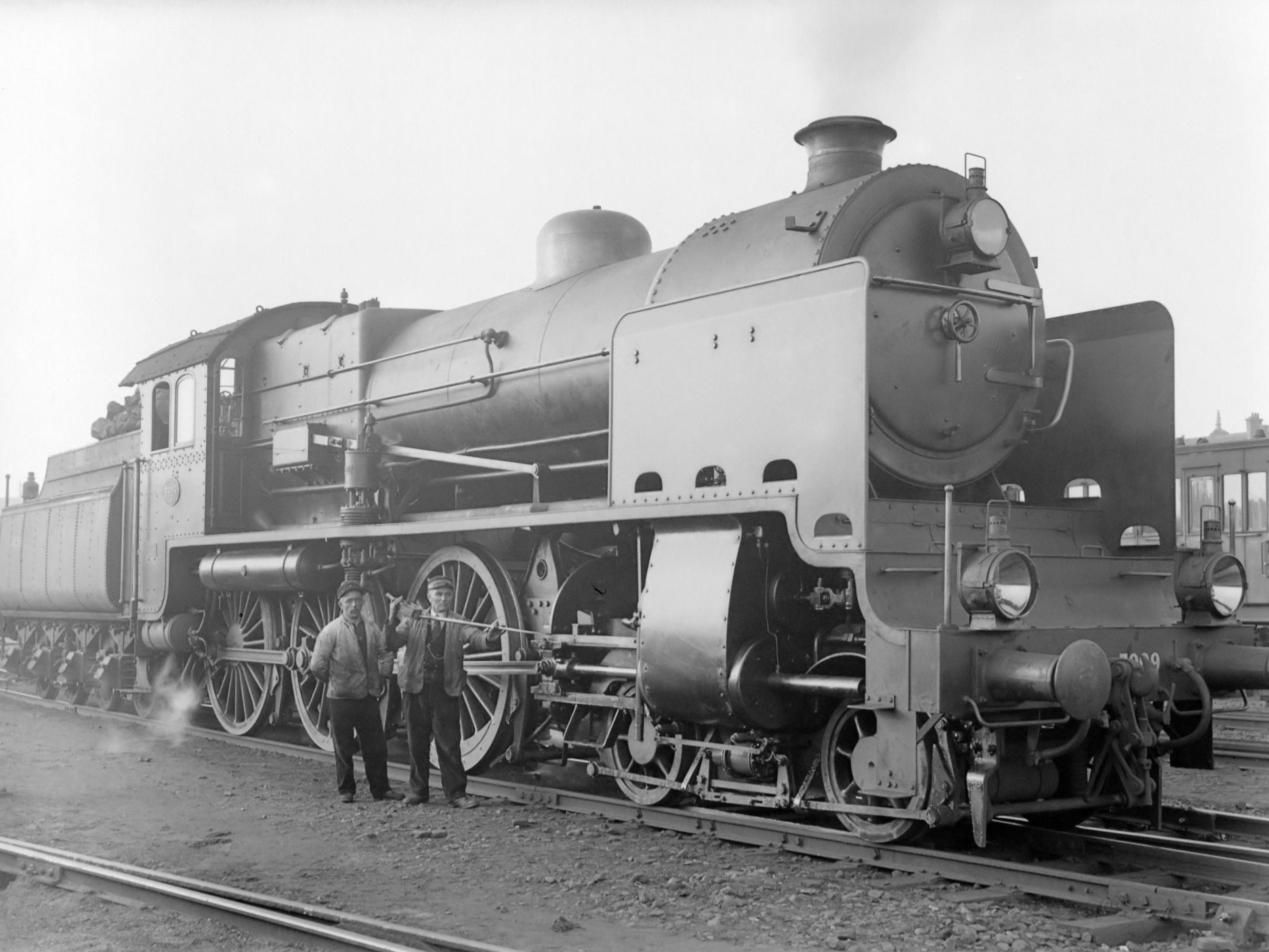
Type and origin
- Power type: Steam
- Builder: Henschel & Sohn
- Build date: 1929 - 1930
- Total produced: 32
Specifications
- Configuration
  - Whyte: 4-6-0
  - UIC: 2'C
- Gauge: 1,435 mm (4 ft 8 1/2 in)
- Leading dia.: 930 mm (3 ft 1 in)
- Driver dia.: 1,850 mm (6 ft 1 in)
- Tender wheels: 1,100 mm (3 ft 7 in)
- Length: 20,410 mm (67 ft 0 in)
- Height: 4,530 mm (14 ft 10 in)
- Loco weight: 84 t (93 short tons; 83 long tons)
- Tender weight: 63 t (69 short tons; 62 long tons), 56 t (62 short tons; 55 long tons) with WD tender
- Fuel capacity: 6 t (6.6 short tons; 5.9 long tons), 9 t (9.9 short tons; 8.9 long tons) with WD tender
- Water cap.: 28 m^{3} (6,200 imp gal), 23 m^{3} (5,100 imp gal) with WD tender
- Firebox
  - Grate area: 3.16 m^{2} (34.0 sq ft)
- Boiler pressure: 14 kg/cm^{2} (200 psi)
- Heating surface
  - Firebox: 17 m^{2} (180 sq ft)
  - Tubes: 150 m^{2} (1,600 sq ft)
- Superheater
  - Heating area: 53 m^{2} (570 sq ft)
- Cylinders: 4
- Cylinder size: 420 mm × 660 mm (17 in × 26 in)
- Valve gear: Walschaerts
Performance figures
- Maximum speed: First: 90 km/h (56 mph), increased in 1930 to: 100 km/h (62 mph), then in 1939 to: 110 km/h (68 mph)
- Power output: ± 1,600 kgf (3,500 lbf)
- Tractive effort: 121 kN (27,000 lbf)
Career
- Operators: NS
- Power class: PO^{4}
- Numbers: 3901 - 3932
- Nicknames: Grote Jumbo (Large Jumbo)
- Withdrawn: 1957

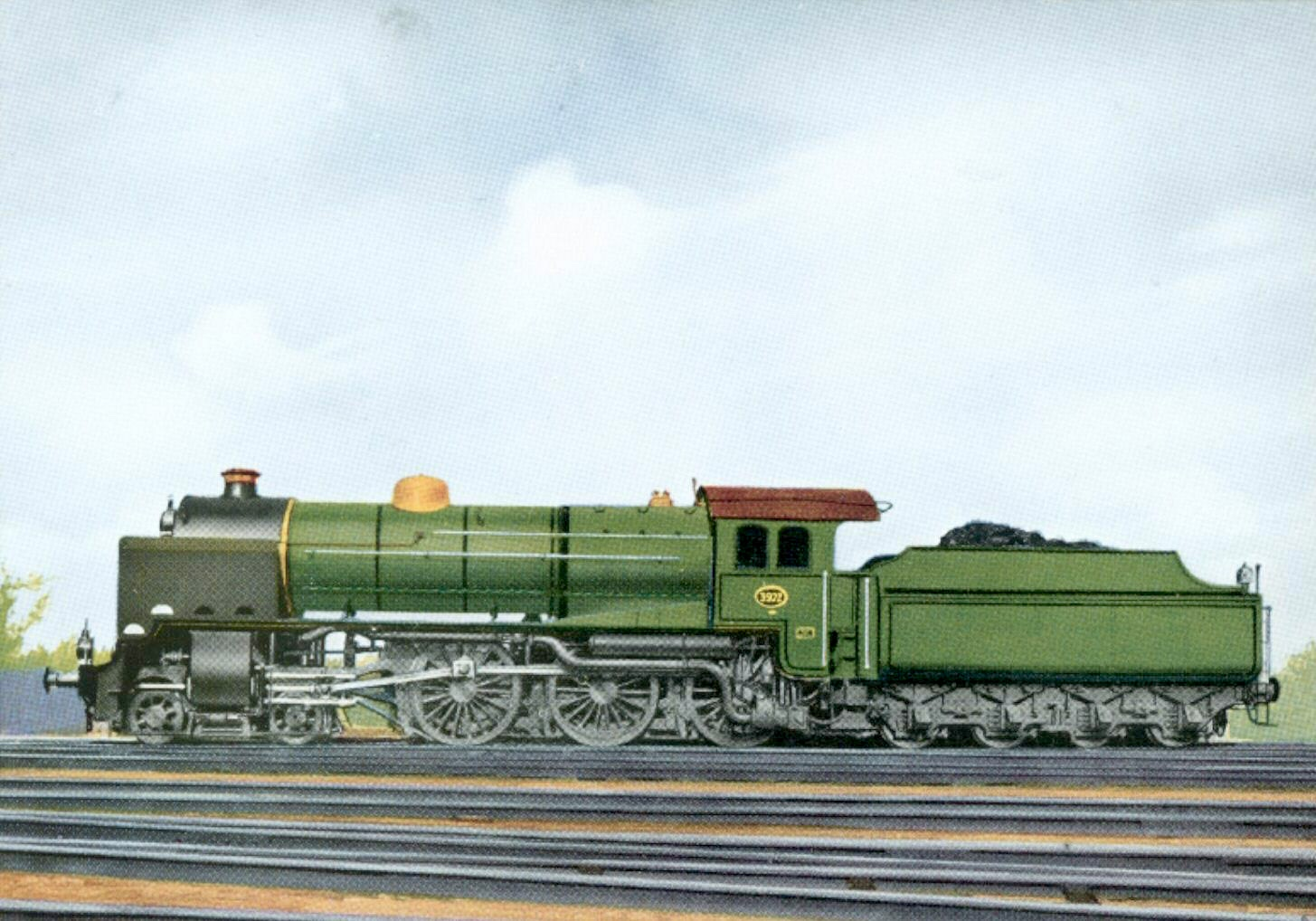
Steam locomotive NS 3922; circa 1930. Collection of the Utrecht Archives.

The NS 3900 was a series of express steam locomotives of the Dutch Railways. The NS 3900 was the last express steam locomotive specifically designed for the Netherlands. The NS 4000 series was ordered in Sweden during the war, however this series was based on an existing Swedish design.

== History ==
At the end of the 1920s, the Dutch Railways needed an express locomotive that was stronger than the 3700 series, because more and more wooden passenger coaches were replaced by steel ones. The axle load could also be increased from 16 to 18 t (17.6 to 19.8 short tons; 15.7 to 17.7 long tons). This resulted in a design that looked at both NS 3600 and NS 3700 series, so with a wheel arrangement of 2'C. The NS 3900 series used bar frame of the 3600 but the design of boiler, cylinders and cab resembled the 3700 series, but with a more powerful boiler and cylinders with a diameter of 420 mm (16.5 in) instead of 400 mm (15.7 in). This increased tractive effort by about 15 percent. The same boiler would later be used on the 6300 series of tank engines. The tender was similar to that of the NS 3600 series and the later built eight wheeled tenders of the series 3700 series. The NS 3900 was able to quickly bring the heaviest passenger trains to a speed of 100 km/h (62 mph).

The manufacturer, Henschel & Sohn, built the locomotives in two batches in 1929 and 1930. The first batch of 22 locomotives from 1929 (3901-3922) was initially not built with smoke deflectors. These were installed in 1930. The second batch of ten locomotives (3923-3932) was fitted with smoke deflectors immediately upon completion.

Until the electrification they pulled the heaviest express and D trains, but there were also disadvantages. The 3900 or 6300 classes could not be fired by hand and the power output of 1,600 kgf (3,500 lbf) was only achieved with the best coal and a good fireman. The locomotives were also technically unsuccessful. The boiler design was old-fashioned and the cylinders and valves were also of an outdated design. The build quality was also poor, which resulted in cracking inner fireboxes and disproportionate wear of various sliding bearings of the cylinder block.

Almost immediately after they were put into service, controversy arose about the quality of the 3900s. This was confirmed because, apart from the coal consumption, the series 6300 showed none of the above deficiencies. Due to the findings of various committees, adjustments were made to the locomotive's construction, which largely solved the problems. The poor steaming of the series, however, persisted until the withdrawal, despite several tests. This was partly due to the construction of the cylinder blocks, where large-scale modifications often meant a completely new cylinder block. Due to the high costs, this was not done with the 3900 series.

When problems with the new diesel-three trainsets on the central network, which had to provide fast connections between the major cities, were replaced by so-called steam diesels services, short express trains pulled by a steam locomotive, which had to be able to keep up with the timetable of the diesel multiple units. Before that, test runs were first held with locomotives of the 2100, 3700 and 3900 series. It turned out that both the 2100 and the 3700 were faster than the 3900. This was due to the fact that the 3900 had a high rolling resistance of its own, which made it type was less suitable for light express trains.

After the Second World War and the rapid electrification of the main lines, the 3900 series was used less and less, mainly on express or D trains on routes that were not yet fully electrified. None have survived into preservation, but the preserved NS 6317 does have the boiler of NS 3927.

== Gallery ==
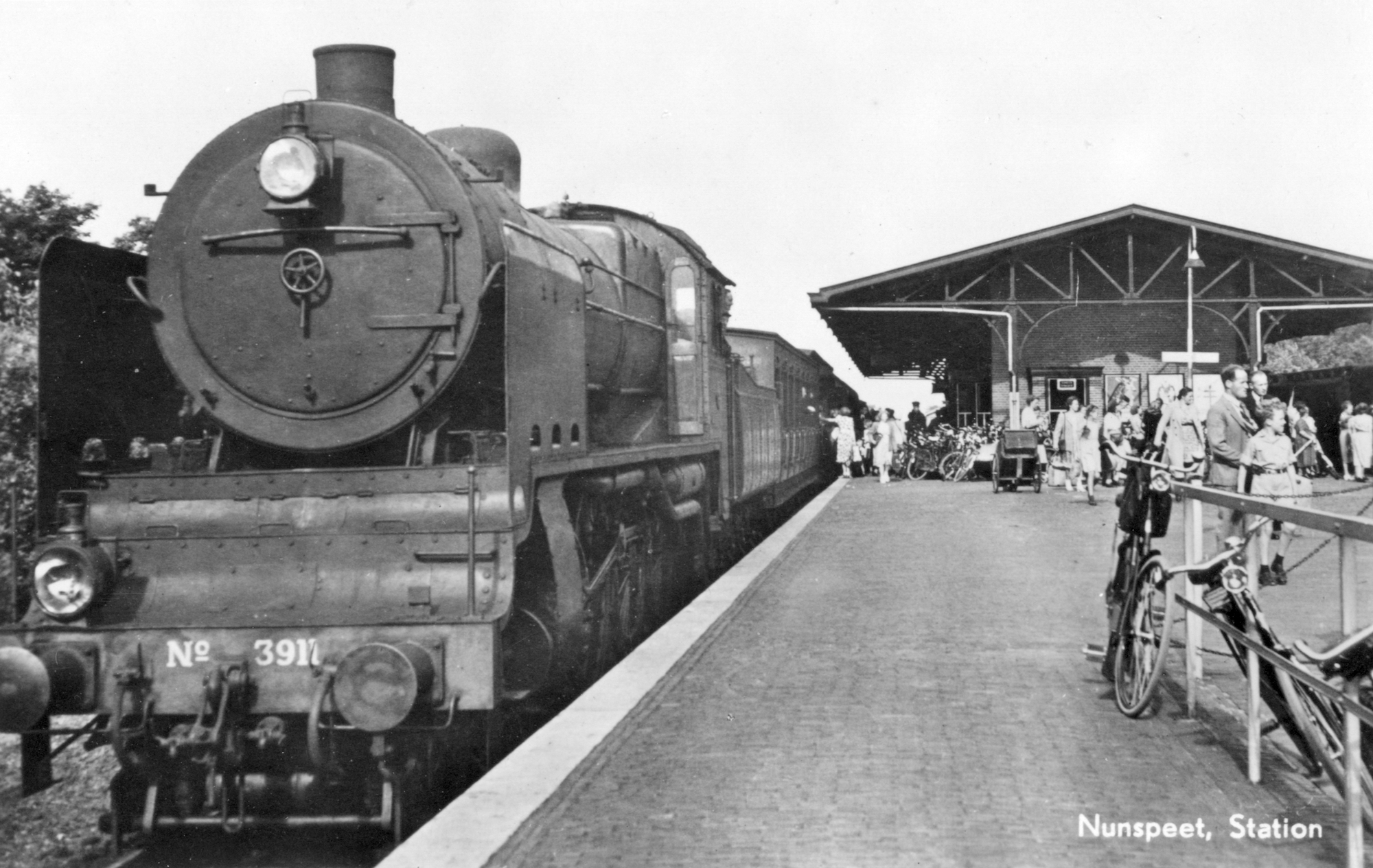
NS 3911 in Nunspeet; circa 1930. Collection of the Utrecht Archives.

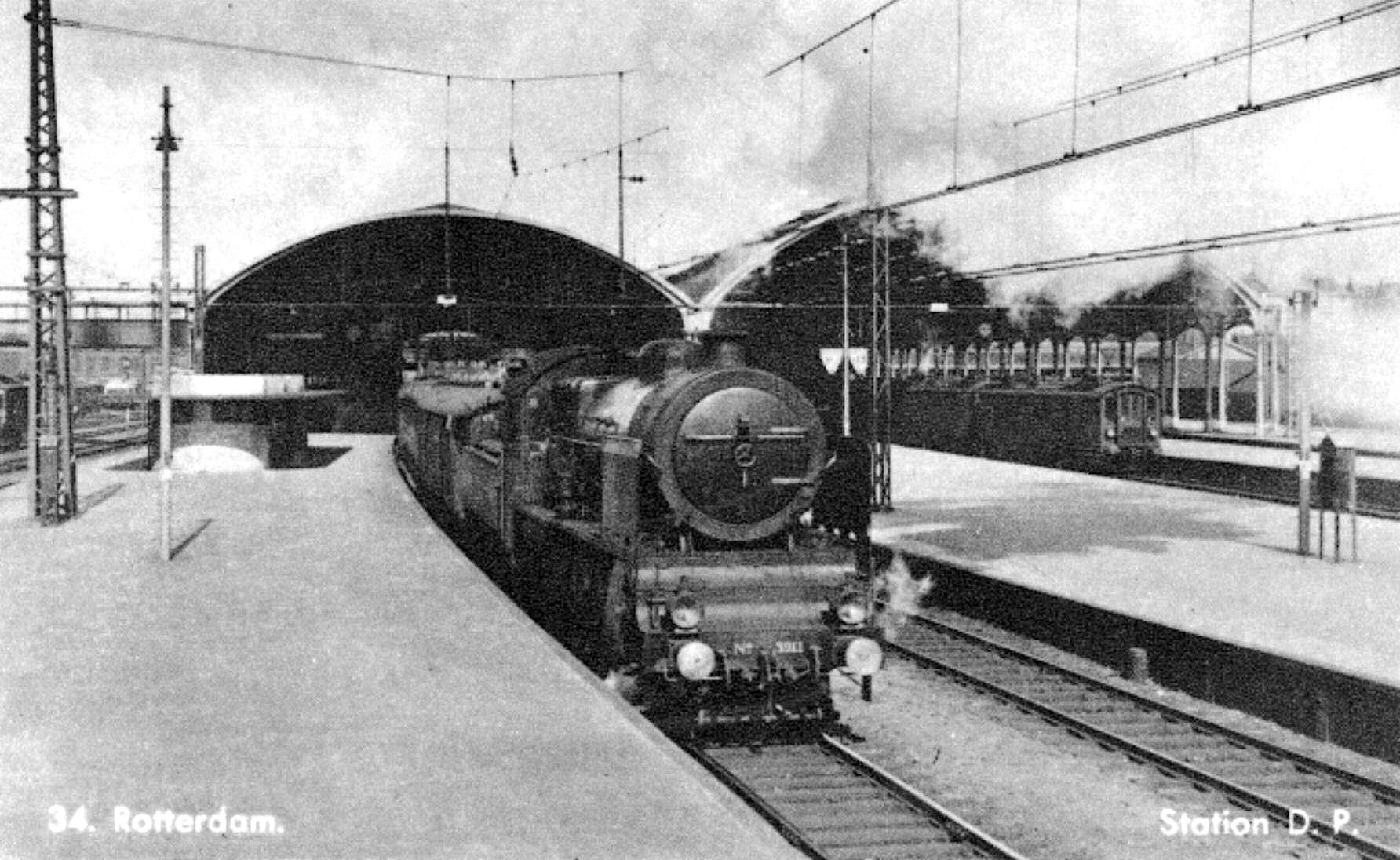
NS 3911 at Rotterdam Delftsche Poort station; circa 1930. Collection of the Utrecht Archives.

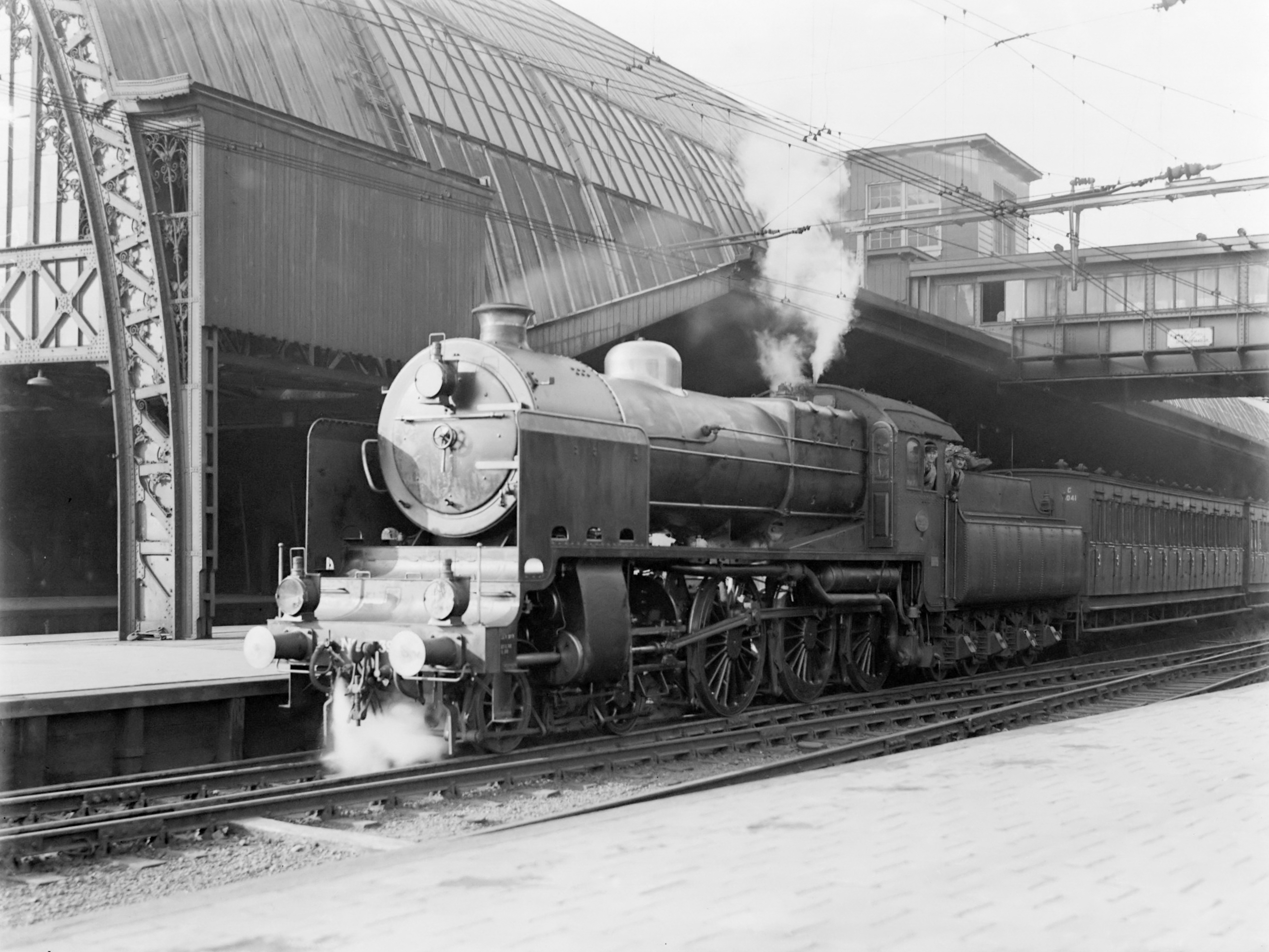
Steam locomotive of the 3900 series at Amsterdam Central Station; 1932.

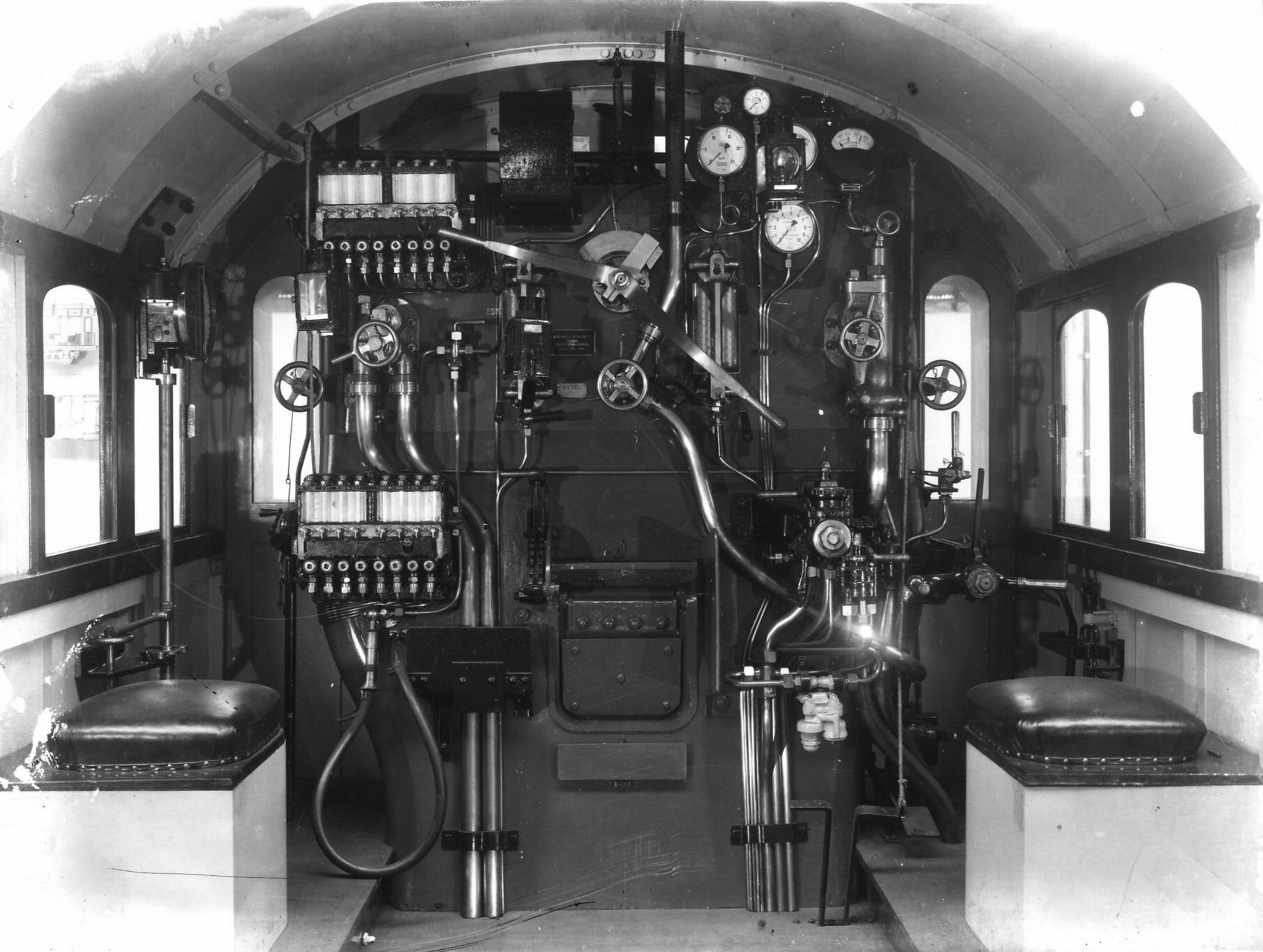
Cab of NS 3902 at the exhibition "100 years of railways in the Netherlands" on the Frederiksplein in Amsterdam. (September 1939)

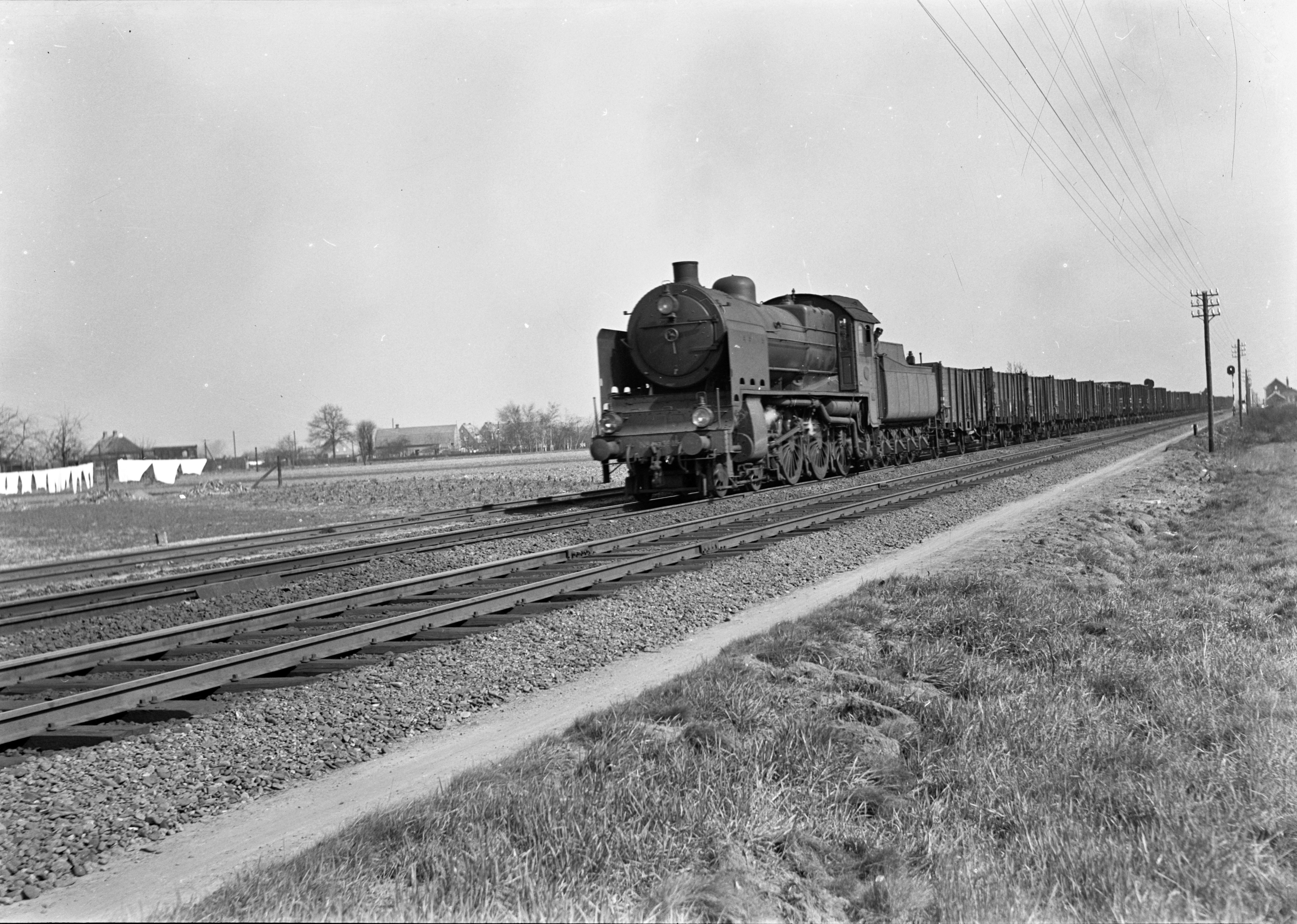
A NS 3900 pulling a coal train near Wijchen. (25-03-1953)

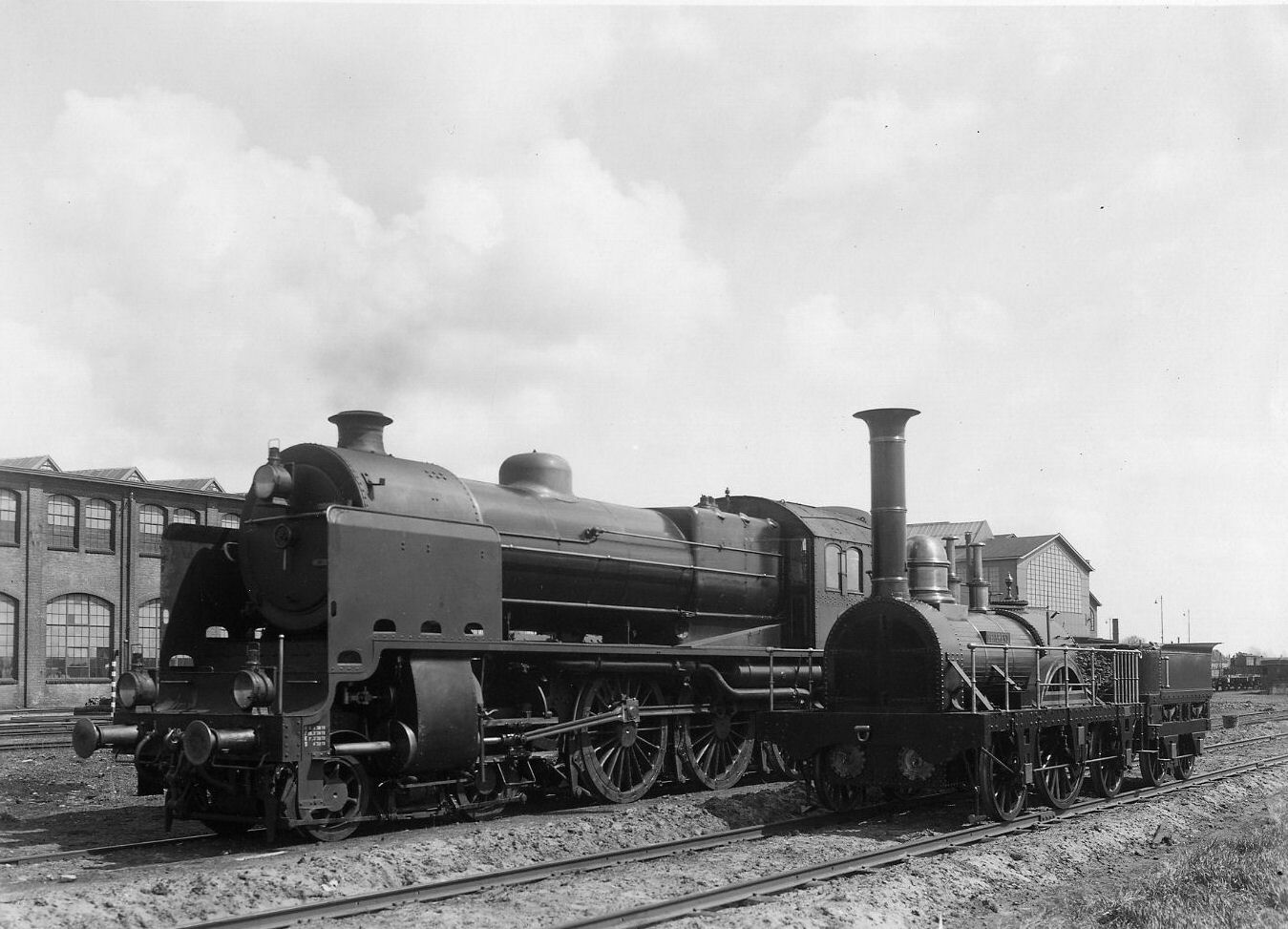
Replica of the steam locomotive "De Arend" of the N.S. next to a steam locomotive of the series 3900 at the central workshop in Zwolle

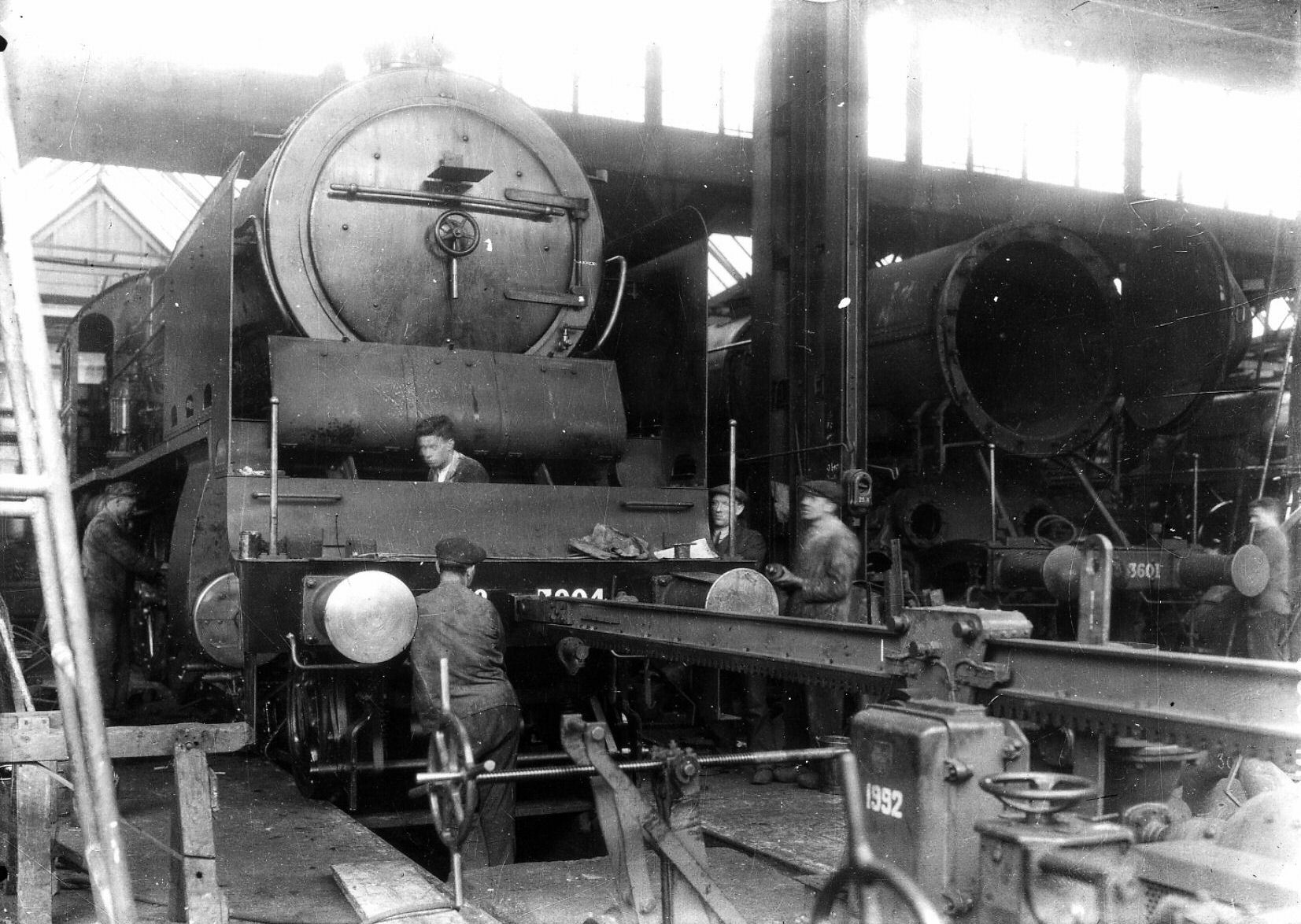
NS 3904 during overhaul in the Central Workshop Tilburg. On the right NS 3601. (30 June 1933)

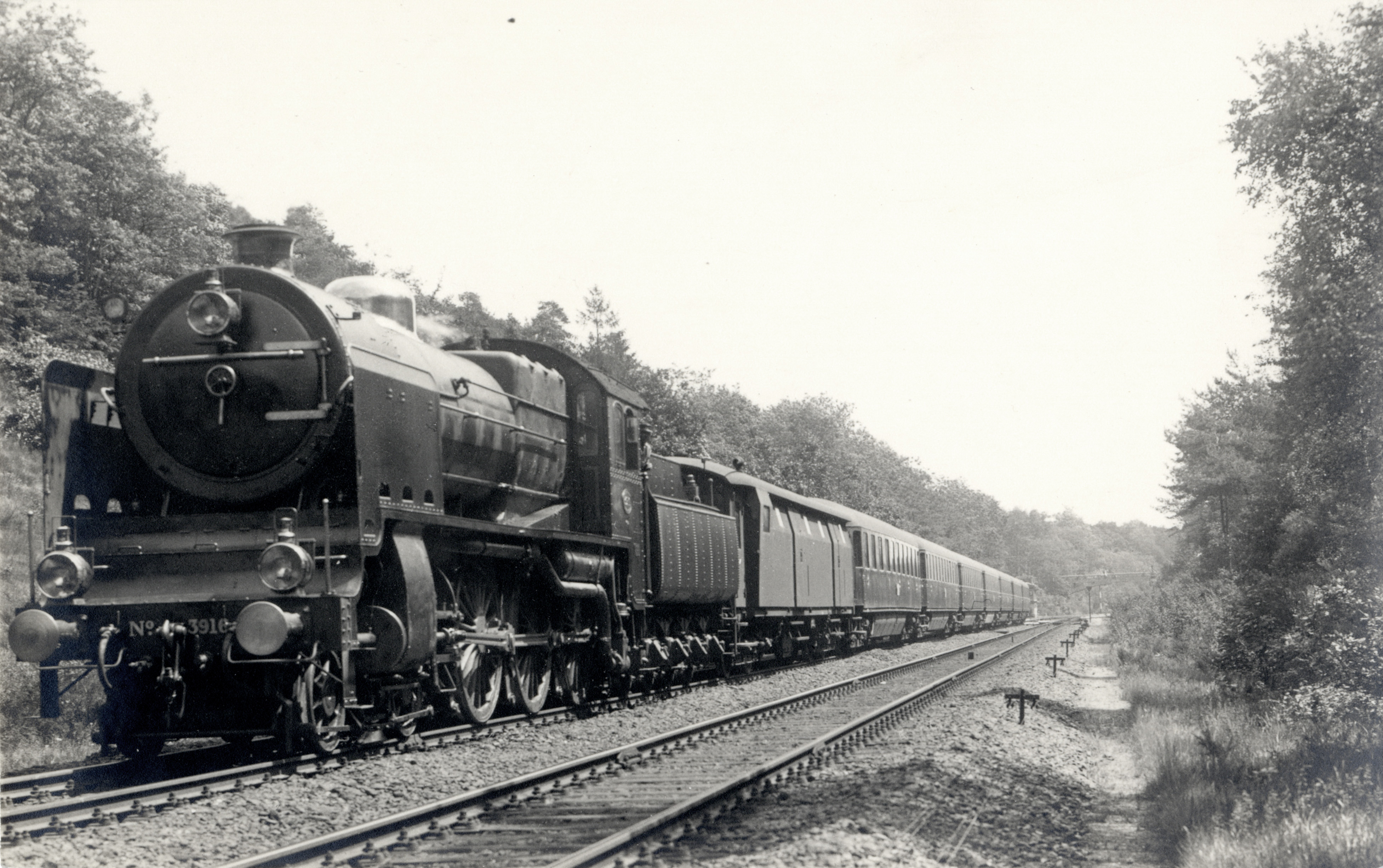
NS 3916 with (steel) carriages in the vicinity of Baarn.

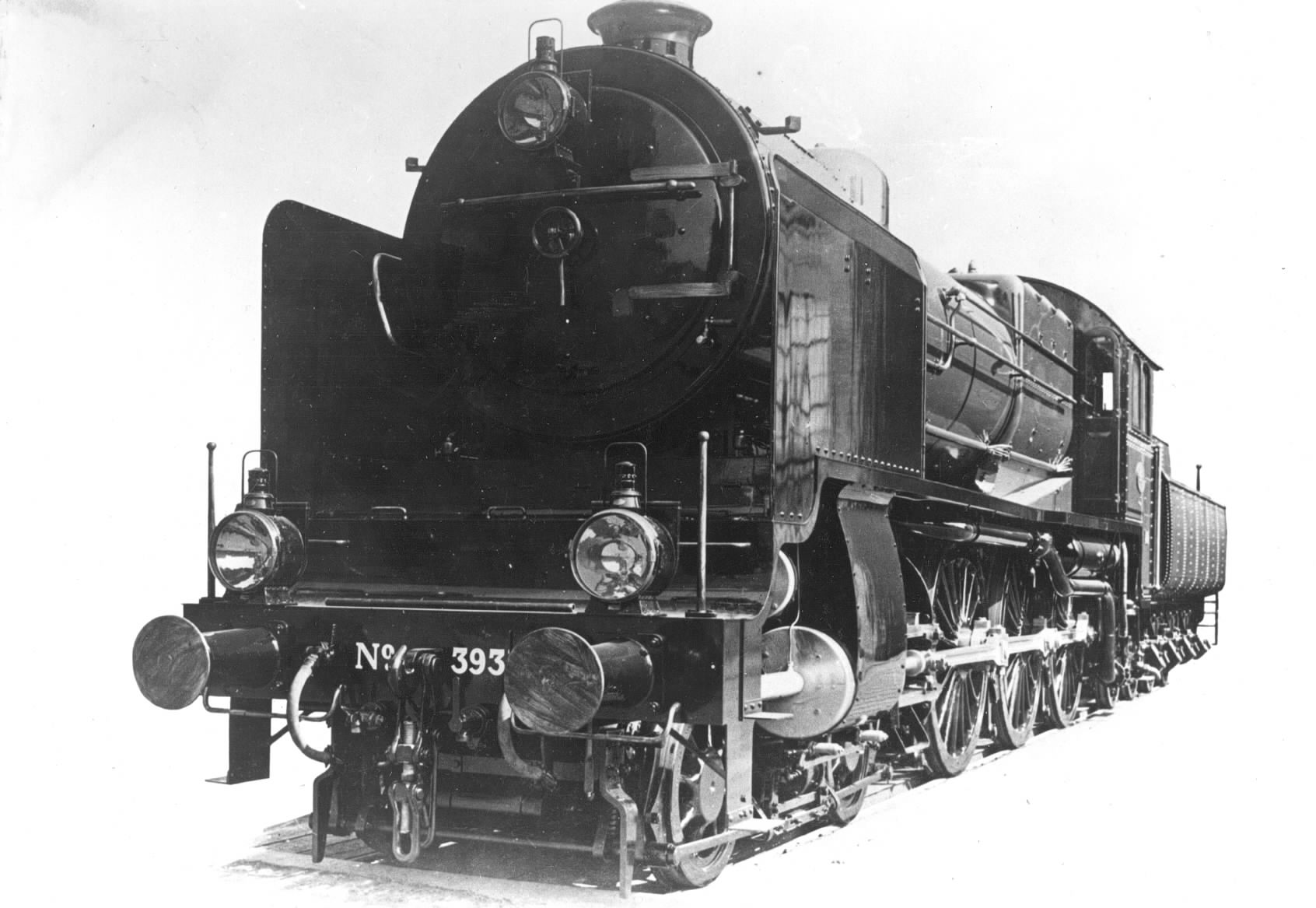
NS 3931

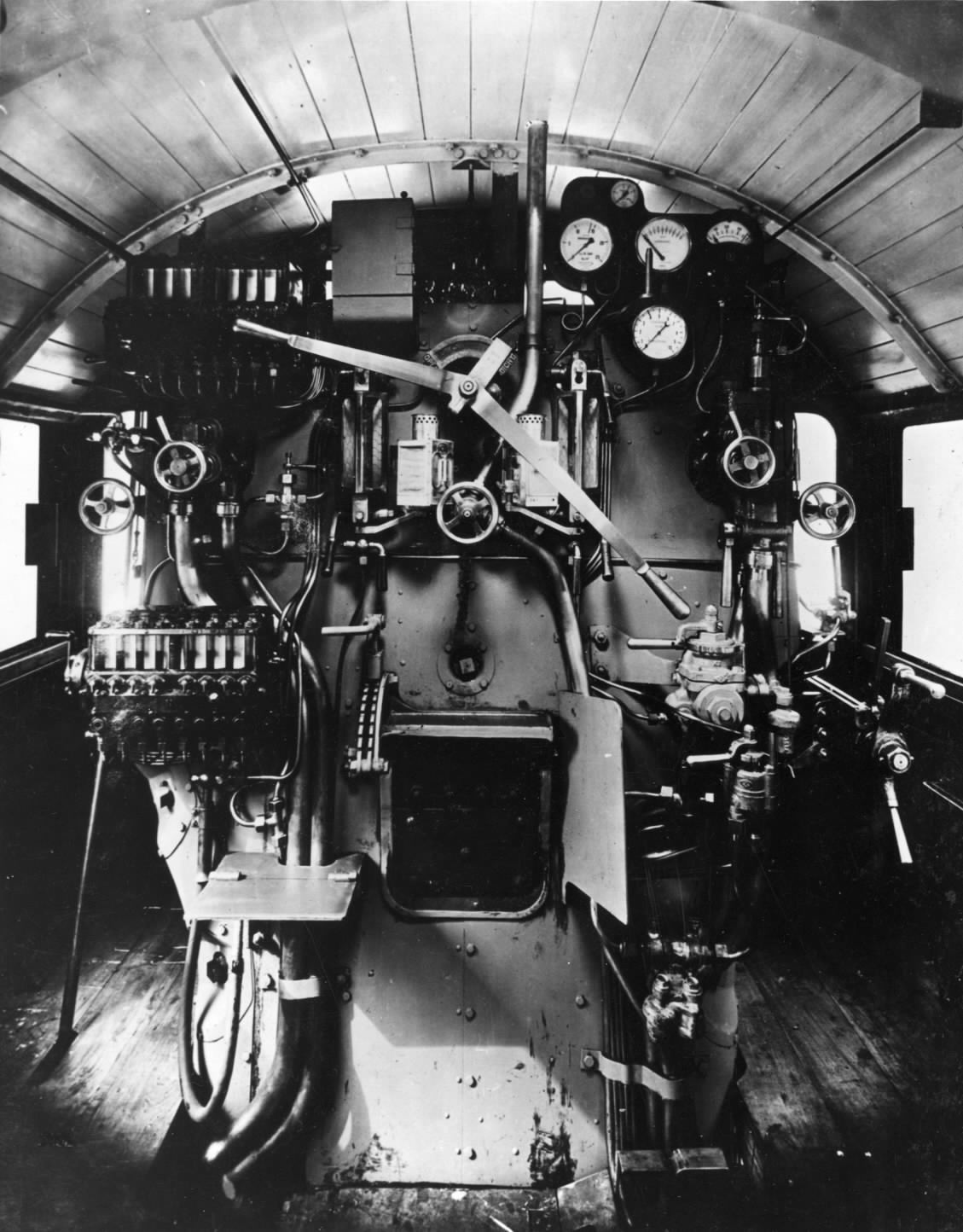
Cab of a NS 3900 series

== Sources ==
- Martin van Oostrom: Stoomlocomotieven serie NS 6300, uitgeverij Stichting Railpublicaties Rosmalen, 1985. ISBN 90-71513-01-7.
