= NS 4700 =

Series of steam locomotives

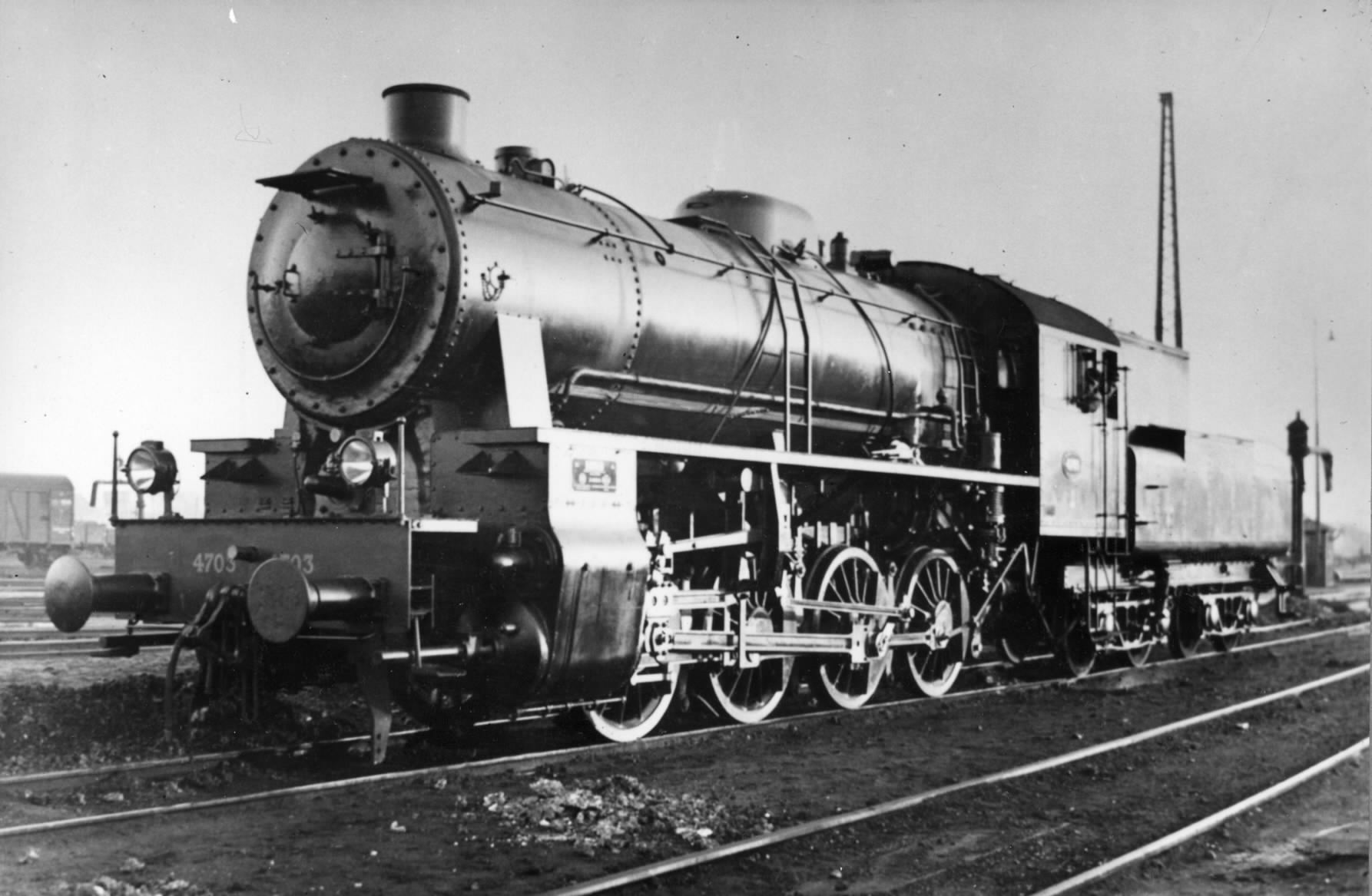
Type and origin
- Power type: Steam
- Builder: NOHAB
- Build date: 1944 - 1946
- Total produced: 35
Specifications
- Configuration
  - Whyte: 0-8-0
  - UIC: D
- Gauge: 1,435 mm (4 ft 8 1/2 in)
- Length: 19,280 mm (63 ft 3 in)
- Height: 4,280 mm (14 ft 1 in)
- Axle load: 18.4 t (20.3 short tons; 18.1 long tons)
- Loco weight: 74.8 t (82.5 short tons; 73.6 long tons)
- Tender weight: 53 t (58 short tons; 52 long tons)
- Fuel type: Coal
- Fuel capacity: 7 t (7.7 short tons; 6.9 long tons)
- Water cap.: 22.5 m^{3} (4,900 imp gal)
- Firebox
  - Grate area: 3.25 m^{2} (35.0 sq ft)
- Boiler pressure: 13 kg/cm^{2} (180 psi)
- Heating surface
  - Firebox: 12.3 m^{2} (132 sq ft)
  - Tubes: 135.8 m^{2} (1,462 sq ft)
- Superheater
  - Heating area: 50 m^{2} (540 sq ft)
- Cylinders: 3
- Cylinder size: 500 mm × 660 mm (20 in × 26 in)
- Valve gear: Walschaerts
Performance figures
- Maximum speed: 70 km/h (43 mph)
- Power output: ± 1,700 hp (1,300 kW)
- Tractive effort: 16,680 kgf (36,800 lbf)
Career
- Operators: NS
- Numbers: 4701 - 4735
- Nicknames: Kerstoom (Christmas tree)
- Withdrawn: 1958
- Preserved: None, All scrapped

The NS 4700 series consisted of 35 0-8-0 steam locomotives for freight trains, which were in service with the Nederlandse Spoorwegen from 1944 to 1958.

== History ==
As early as World War II, the Dutch government in London ordered 50 steam locomotives from the Swedish factory Nydqvist & Holm AB (NOHAB) in Trollhättan in order to quickly bring the fleet of locomotives, which had been severely depleted by war, up to standard. In order to save time, existing models of typical Swedish locomotives were chosen. These were 15 express locomotives with the 4-6-0 wheel arrangement (NS 4000 series) and 35 freight locomotives with the 0-8-0 wheel arrangement (NS 4700)

The 4700s were delivered in the years 1944 to 1946, following the example of existing locomotives of the Swedish private railway company Grängesberg-Oxelösund (TGOJ) and were very modern by Dutch standards. They were derived from the Swedish type M3b. Some tenders and boilers were delivered by Motala Verkstad and ASJ. When ordering the locomotives, the name 'Swedish Freight Locomotive' was given, which lead to the manufacturer mistaking it for a type designation and erroneously numbered the first locomotive 'ZG1'. Just like the 4000 series, they had a 3-cylinder layout and all axles ran on SKF ball bearings. Upon delivery, they were equipped with a large cow catcher and a large searchlight, which were immediately removed.

The driver's cabin was completely closed off with a bellows on the tender, which was identical to that of the 4000 series. In contrast to locomotives designed in the Netherlands, the instruments, such as the pressure gauge and the speedometer, were clearly arranged in front of the regulator key (drive handle). Just like the 4000 series, the 4700 series were also equipped with steel inner fireboxes, which were later replaced by copper ones in all locomotives. The locomotives had electric lighting, also in the driving gear, to facilitate night-time maintenance. This earned them the nickname "Christmas tree" from the staff.

In 1949 a new numbering scheme was introduced for the tenders of the steam locomotives. From that time on they were given their own number; for the 4700 series the numbers became 4016-4050, which made the tenders of the 4000 and 4700 series more easily interchangeable.

== Design ==
These freight locomotives were initially used for passenger trains to cover for a motive power shortage. They were later reassigned to haul coal trains from the Limburg mining region to the west, where they performed very well. If the remaining German locomotives of the NS 4900 series (former DRG Class 50) are not counted - they hardly ran at all and quickly returned to Germany - they were the strongest steam locomotives in terms of tractive force that the NS has ever had.

At the beginning of 1955, the 4700 series was the only steam locomotive series that was still in service with the NS. However, that year also saw the start of the decommissioning of the 4700s. Nos. 4731 and 4734 were the last steam locomotives that still ran according to a planned timetable with the NS. They were finally decommissioned in February 1958. Together with the 4732 and a few other NS steam locomotives, they were scrapped in the spring of 1958 at the Van Dijk company in Veenendaal. The fact that the 4700s were very popular with the staff is proven by the words "Rest in peace, dear Swede" being inscribed on 4732 when it arrived at the Van Dijk scrapyard.

On the Haanrade to Heerlen line near Eygelshoven, there was a slope with a gradient of 18 per mile. Even a 4700 could not pull a coal train consisting of 40 loaded coal wagons on its own, so another 4700 was used to assist it. They continued this work until NS fully phased out steam in 1957. When the NS Class 2200 diesel locomotives took over this work, the 4700s remained active in banking duties for a long time. The 4700 was coupled directly to the leading 2200 in mixed traction, or pushed at the back as a banking locomotive.

== Sources ==
- R.C. Statius Muller, A.J. Veenendaal jr., H. Waldorp: De Nederlandse stoomlocomotieven. De Alk, Alkmaar, 2005. ISBN 90-6013-262-9
- H. van Poll: Stoomtractie bij de Nederlandse Spoorwegen 1944 - 1958, De Bataafse Leeuw, 1985. ISBN 90-6707-078-5
