= NS 4000 =

Class of Dutch 4-6-0 locomotives

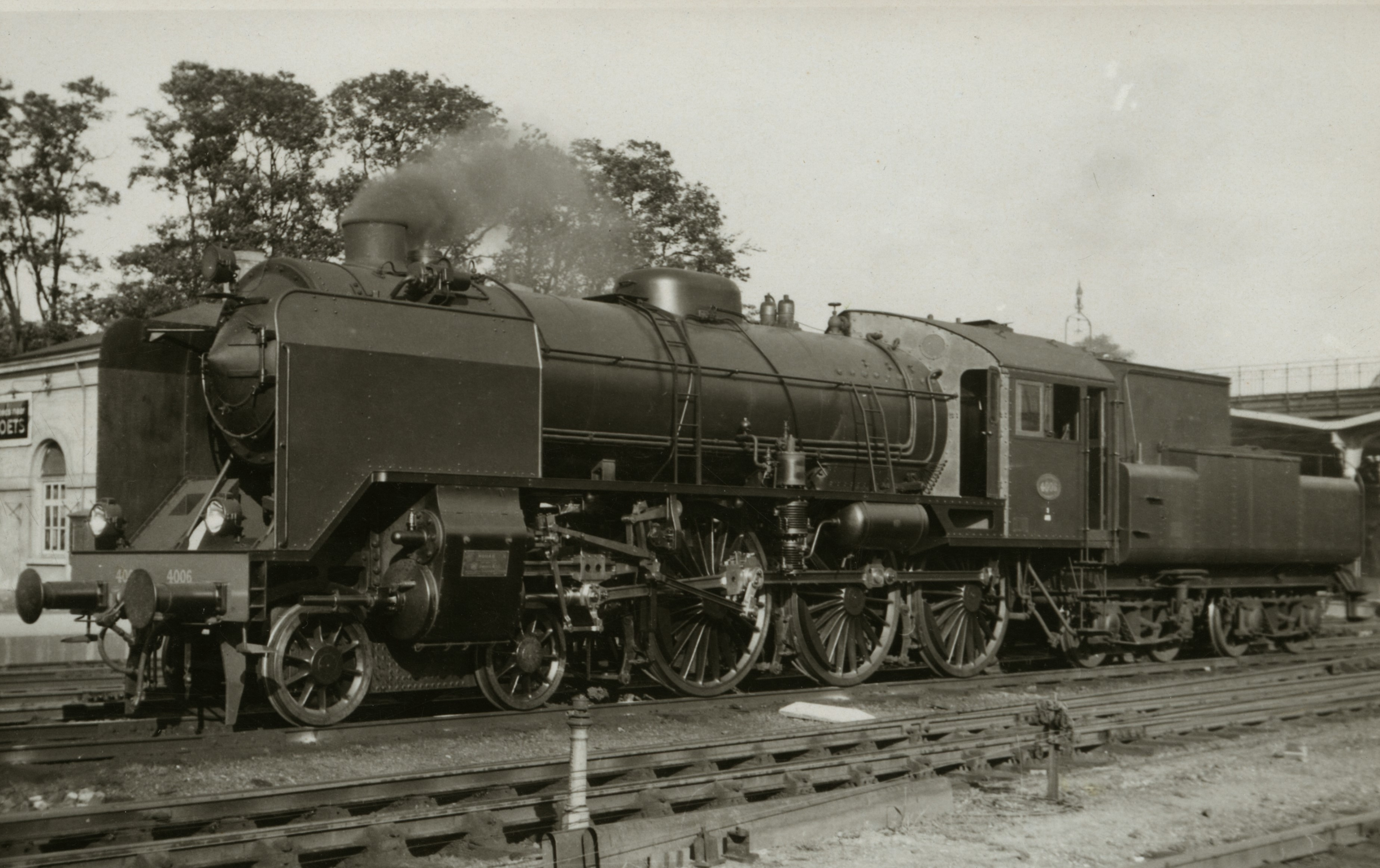
Type and origin
- Power type: Steam
- Builder: NOHAB
- Build date: 1945 - 1946
- Total produced: 15
Specifications
- Configuration
  - Whyte: 4-6-0
  - UIC: 2'C
- Gauge: 1,435 mm (4 ft 8 1/2 in)
- Length: 20,775 mm (68 ft 1.9 in)
- Height: 4,280 mm (14 ft 1 in)
- Axle load: 18.4 t (20.3 short tons; 18.1 long tons)
- Loco weight: 83.6 t (92.2 short tons; 82.3 long tons)
- Tender weight: 53 t (58 short tons; 52 long tons)
- Fuel type: Coal
- Fuel capacity: 7 t (7.7 short tons; 6.9 long tons)
- Water cap.: 22.5 m^{3} (4,900 imp gal)
- Firebox
  - Grate area: 3.25 m^{2} (35.0 sq ft)
- Boiler pressure: 12 kg/cm^{2} (170 psi)
- Heating surface
  - Firebox: 14.5 m^{2} (156 sq ft)
  - Tubes: 147 m^{2} (1,580 sq ft)
- Superheater
  - Heating area: 50 m^{2} (540 sq ft)
- Cylinders: 3
- Cylinder size: 500 mm × 660 mm (20 in × 26 in)
- Valve gear: Walschaerts
Performance figures
- Maximum speed: 120 km/h (75 mph)
- Power output: ± 1,650 hp (1,230 kW)
- Tractive effort: 107.9 kN (24,300 lbf)
Career
- Operators: NS
- Numbers: 4001 - 4015
- Nicknames: Kerstoom (Christmas tree)
- Withdrawn: 1956
- Preserved: All scrapped

The NS 4000 was a series of express steam locomotives of the Dutch Railways from 1945 to 1956.

== History ==
Following the occupation of the Netherlands by the German Wehrmacht, the Dutch Railways (Nederlandse Spoorwegen, NS) had to surrender many of their locomotives to the Deutsche Reichsbahn. By the end of World War II, 466 of the 866 Dutch steam locomotives as well as 83% of diesel and electric multiple units had been taken to Germany. The Dutch government-in-exile therefore had already ordered new steam locomotives from Nydqvist & Holm AB (NOHAB) in neutral Sweden in 1942 to remedy the vehicle shortage anticipated for the end of the war. After delivery of the NS 6300 series had been completed in 1931, the NS had initially assumed that they would no longer need to buy any steam locomotives. 15 express train locomotives with the wheel arrangement 2'C and 35 freight locomotives with the wheel arrangement D were ordered. The express locomotives were classified as the series NS 4000 and the freight locomotives as the series NS 4700.

== Design ==
The NS 4000 was an extremely modern three-cylinder locomotive by Dutch standards; all cylinders drove the first axle. The example of the 4000 ran on the Swedish private railway company Bergslagernas Järnvägar, they were derived from the type 'H3s'. For example, all axles ran on SKF roller bearings, the back of the streamlined cab was completely closed with folding bellows on the tender and the locomotives had electric lighting as well.

The tender was of the Gölsdorf type, and the two 4 wheeled bogies also ran on roller bearings. The tenders of the series NS 4000 and 4700 were identical. A new numbering scheme for steam locomotive tenders introduced in 1949 renumbered the series 4700 tenders to 4016–4050, creating a continuous, interchangeable series.

The locomotives looked very attractive with their small pointed smoke box door and large smoke deflectors, but this was not really useful when cleaning the smoke box or when changing the fire tubes. Over the years, the smokebox doors were replaced by larger ones, from scrapped Austerity locomotives of the NS 4300 and NS 5000 series. A bigger problem was that the locomotives had a steel inner firebox. It was therefore decided to replace these with copper ones, which was a costly investment, also because a few extra boilers had to be purchased from NOHAB, which were also fitted with steel inner fireboxes. After eleven locomotives had received a new copper inner firebox, the rebuilding was stopped. Nos. 4002, 4003, 4011 and 4015 still had a steel inner firebox.

== Technical ==
Compared to the previously predominant express steam locomotives of the NS 3700 and 3900 series, the NS 4000 series had many features that were new and unknown to the Dutch railway workers. Due to the northern temperatures, the locomotives had a completely enclosed cab. The cab windows was also something completely new in the Netherlands. The locomotives were designed as three cylinders, each powered by Walschaert's valve gear. The sandbox and steamdome shared a dome, also a feature of Swedish locomotives, as was the tender used, which was based on a design by Karl Gölsdorf. It was a very popular design and was widely used for kkStB locomotives. The conical and relatively small smokebox door was typical of Swedish designs.

The roller bearings were used on all axles, and the self-cleaning smokebox was very technically advanced in the Netherlands. All locomotives were factory fitted with smoke deflectors and steel fireboxes; the latter were replaced by a copper variant on eleven locomotives in 1952. The electric lighting of the engine, previously unknown to the NS, proved helpful in terms of entertainment. It caused the locomotives to be nicknamed "Christmas Trees".

== NS service ==
The first locomotive was delivered from Sweden via Denmark and Germany in March 1946 and arrived in Hengelo on March 17. On March 20, the first locomotive successfully completed the first test run. By the fall of 1946, all 4000 series locomotives had been delivered and put into service. They were first shedded in Amsterdam, then in Rotterdam - Feyenoord and Eindhoven, where they also had to pull goods trains in addition to express and passenger trains.

After the war, the NS accelerated the (re)electrification of the Dutch railway network, which was interrupted by the war, and in 1947 the locomotives of the series 4000 were moved to the depots in Zwolle and Amersfoort. In addition to the replacement by electric locomotives and multiple units, the locomotives weren't very popular with the Dutch railway personnel because of their often unknown controls. Whenever possible, the more popular "Jumbos" of the NS 3700 series were used. In Zwolle and Amersfoort, they initially ran express trains to Leeuwarden and Groningen. From 1948 all locomotives were allocated to Zwolle. In 1952 all the eligible lines in the east of the Netherlands were electrified. The locomotives were therefore brought back to Amsterdam from Zwolle. The local railway depot used them for heavy express trains to Arnhem and the German border station Emmerich, including important trains such as the "Holland-Italy Express", which often had to be double-headed, and the Amsterdam part of the Rheingold. From January 1953 onwards it was possible to run electric locomotives and multiple units to Arnhem after that the NS 4000 series lost their place on these trains. They were withdrawn between 1954 and early 1956, the remaining locomotives were only used on goods trains and for special services.

== Preservation ==
None of the class was preserved, but the Zuid-Limburgse Stoomtrein Maatschappij has two Swedish locomotives of the series B 1200 that were also built by Nydqvist & Holm (NOHAB) and somewhat resemble the NS 4000 series. In Sweden there are two locomotives of the sister series 'H3s' that have been preserved.

Furthermore, the tenders of locomotives 4003 and 4025 (4710) have been preserved, which were used in 1983 as a water wagon and used as a rail grinding train until 1983, which are now in the possession of Hoogovens Stoom IJmuiden, the upper part of tender 4025 (4710) has been placed and on the undercarriage of a generator wagon.

== Gallery ==
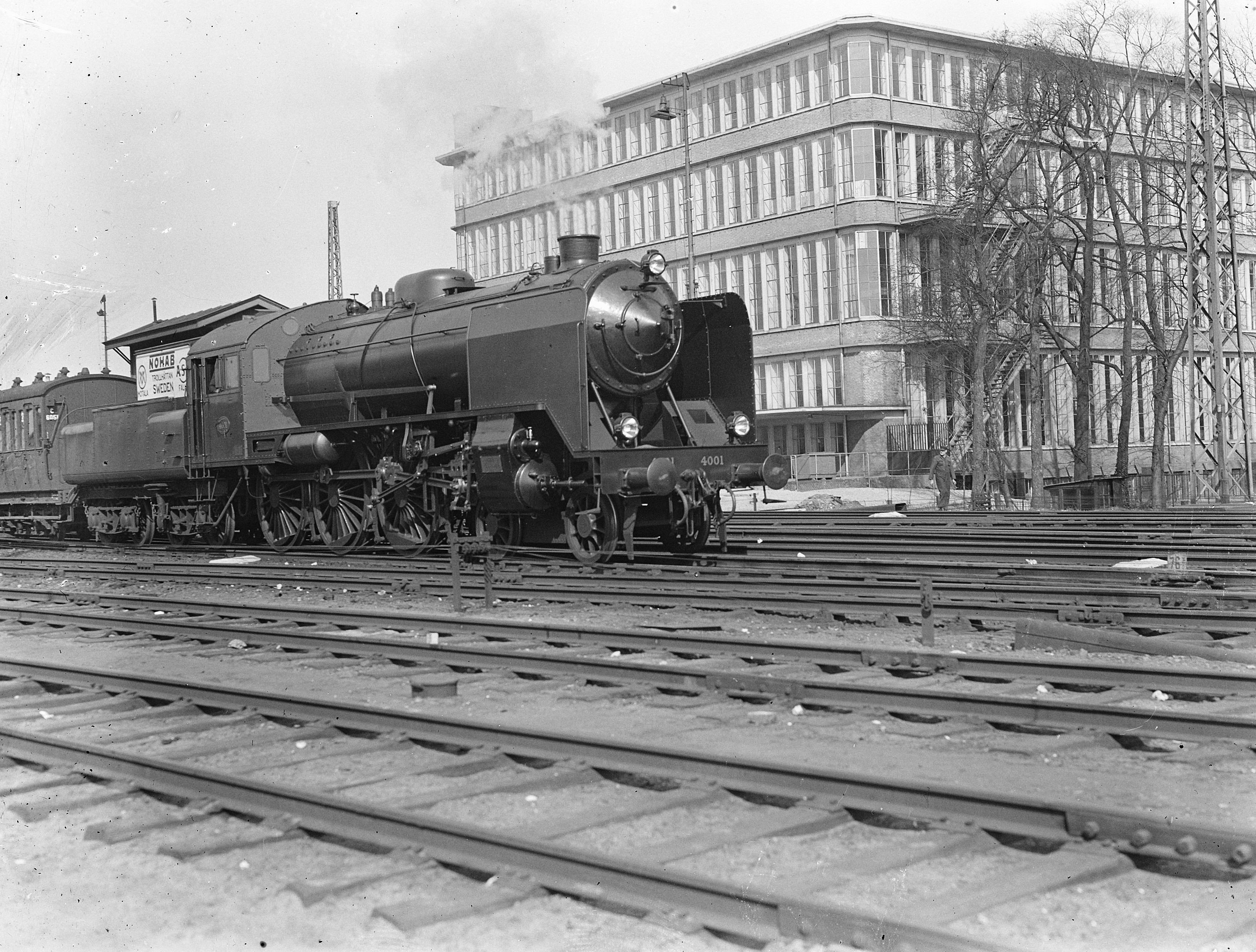
NS 4001 with a passenger train. (1946)

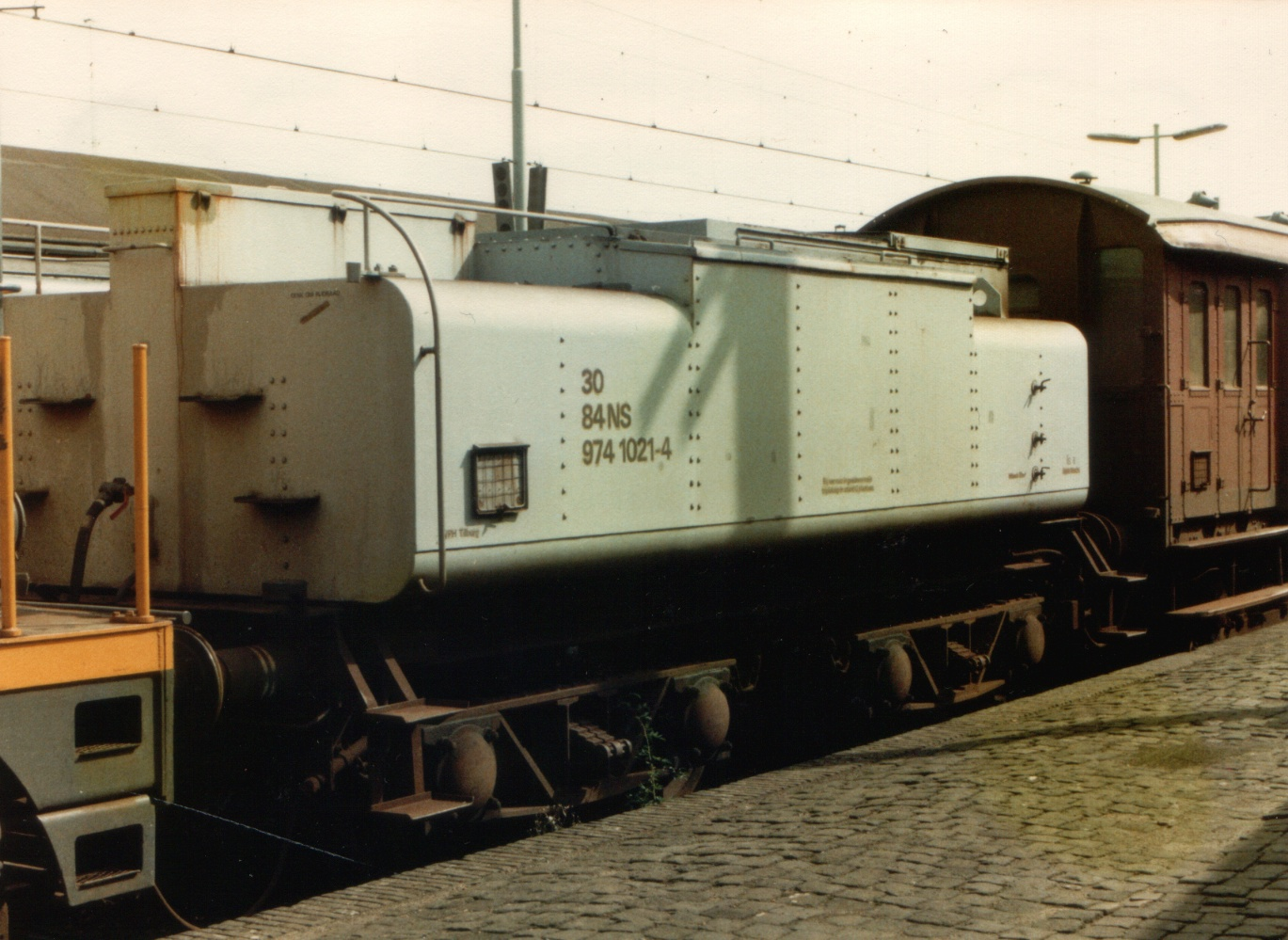
Tender 4003 as a water wagon for rail grinding train in Hilversum ca. 1983

The railway bridge over the IJssel near Zwolle has been put back into use with an NS 4000 going over it.

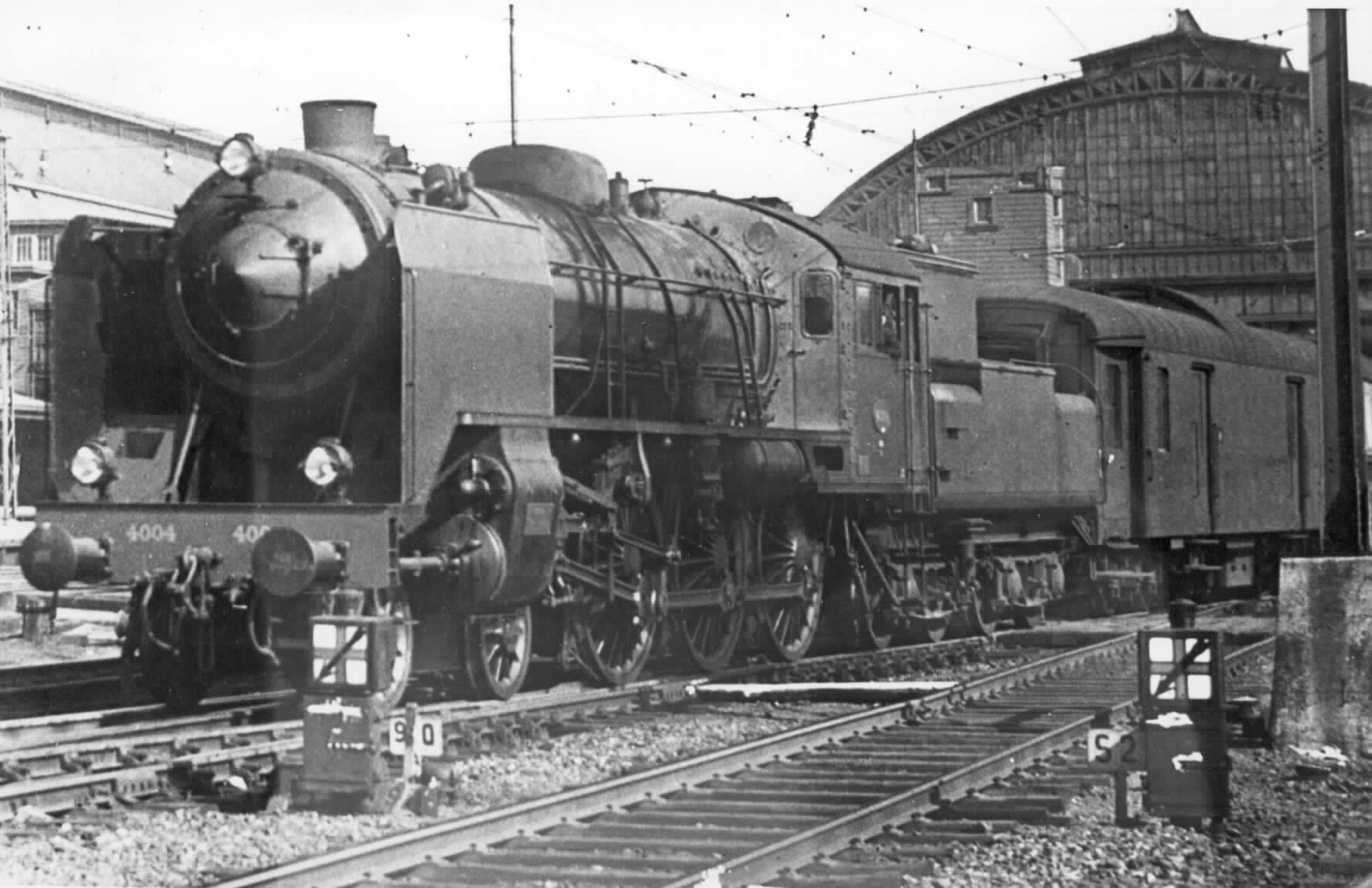
NS 4004 in Amsterdam CS (Between 1946 and 1956)

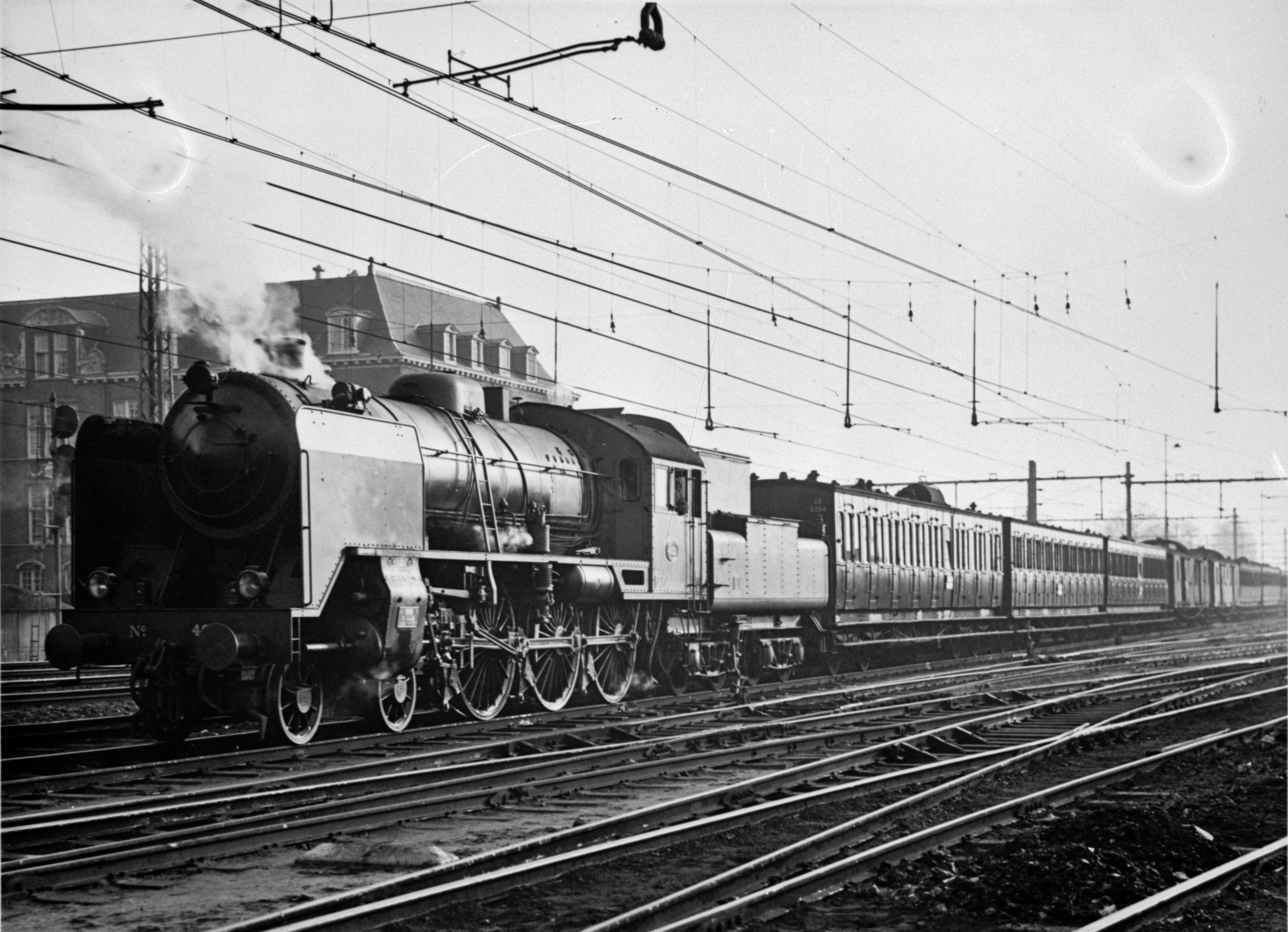
NS 4011 with a passenger train at Utrecht C.S. (1950)

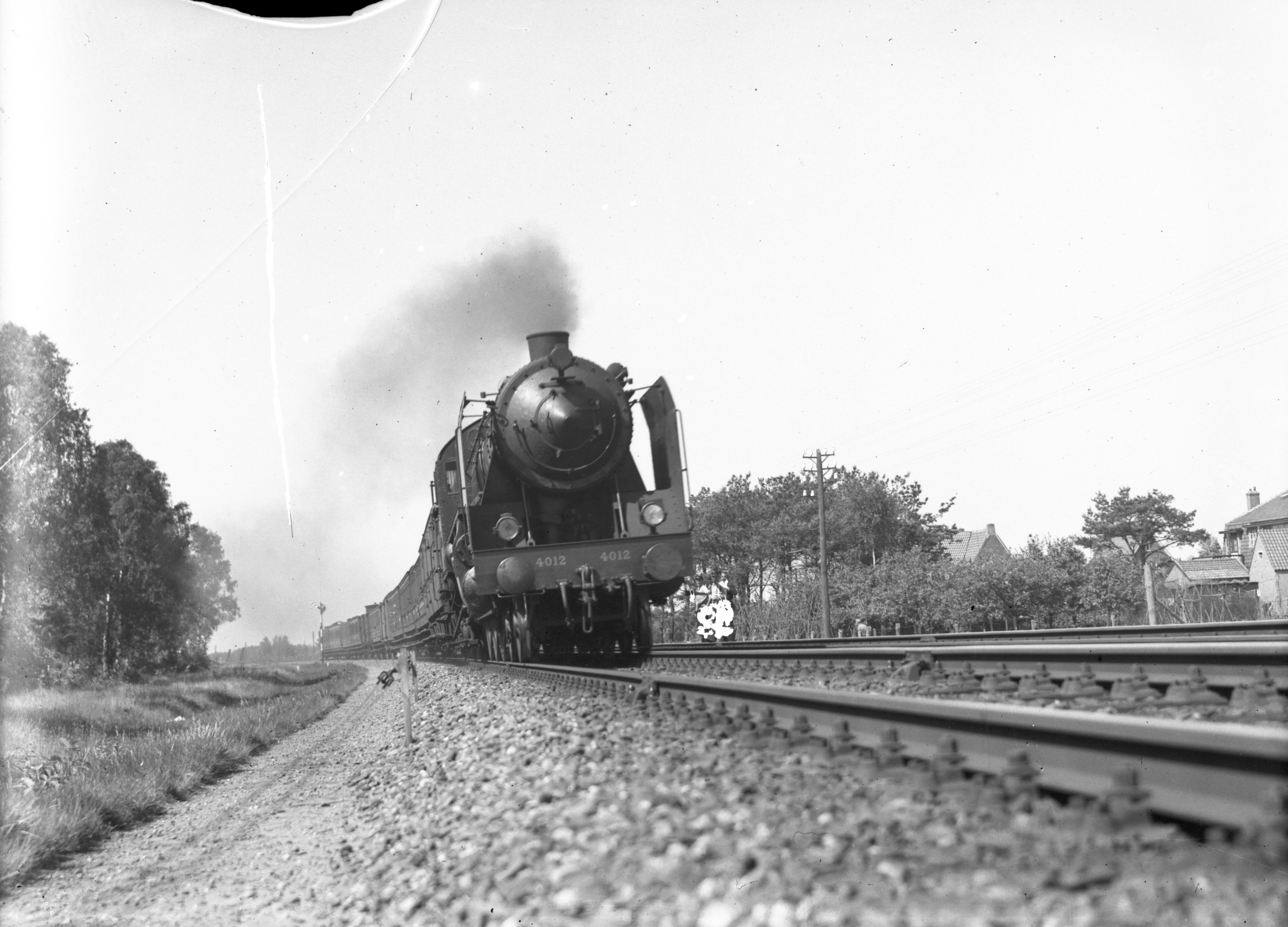
NS 4012 near Ermelo (Between 1946 and 1956)

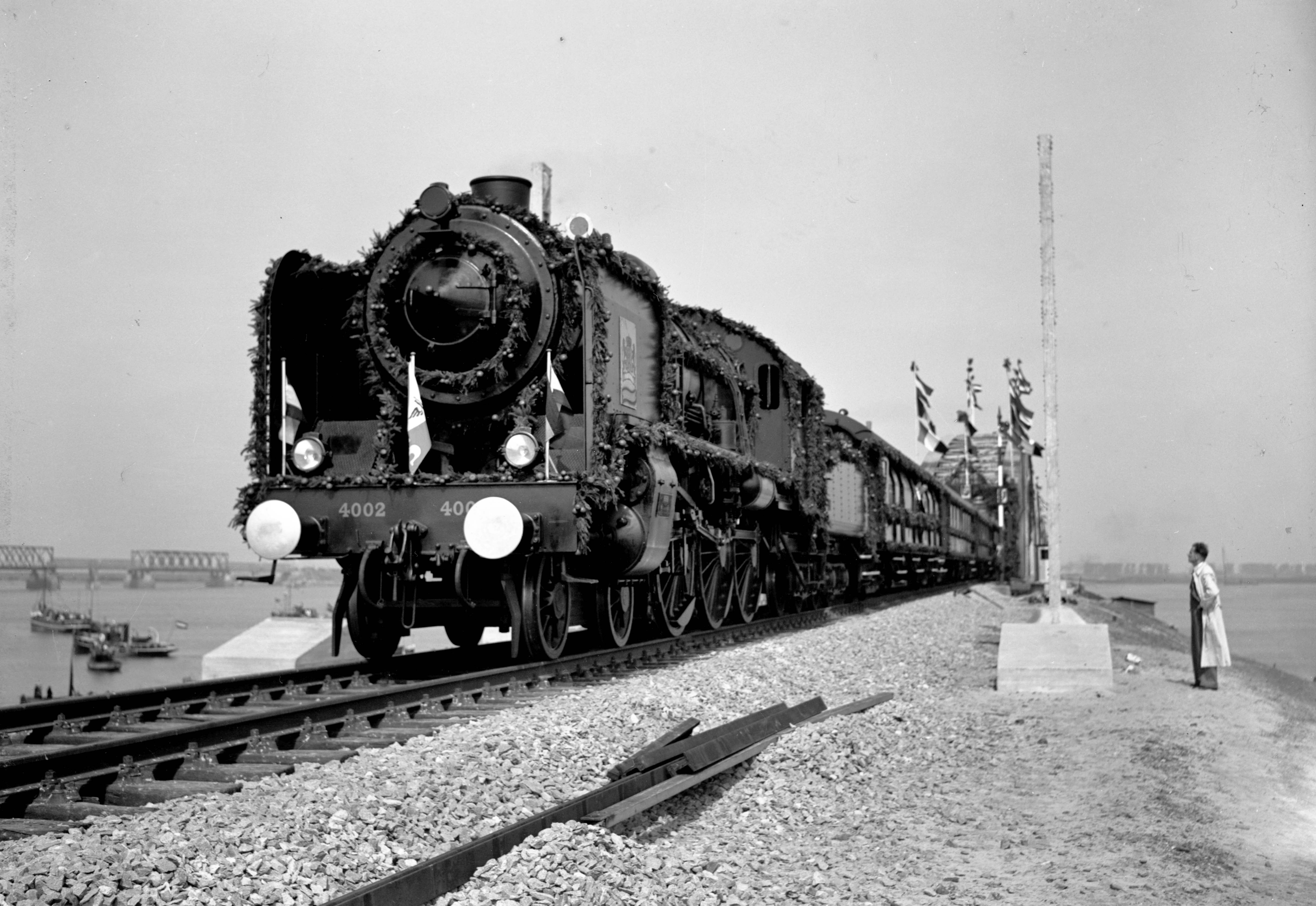
NS 4002 at the restored railway bridge over the Hollands Diep near Moerdijk. (24-08-1946)

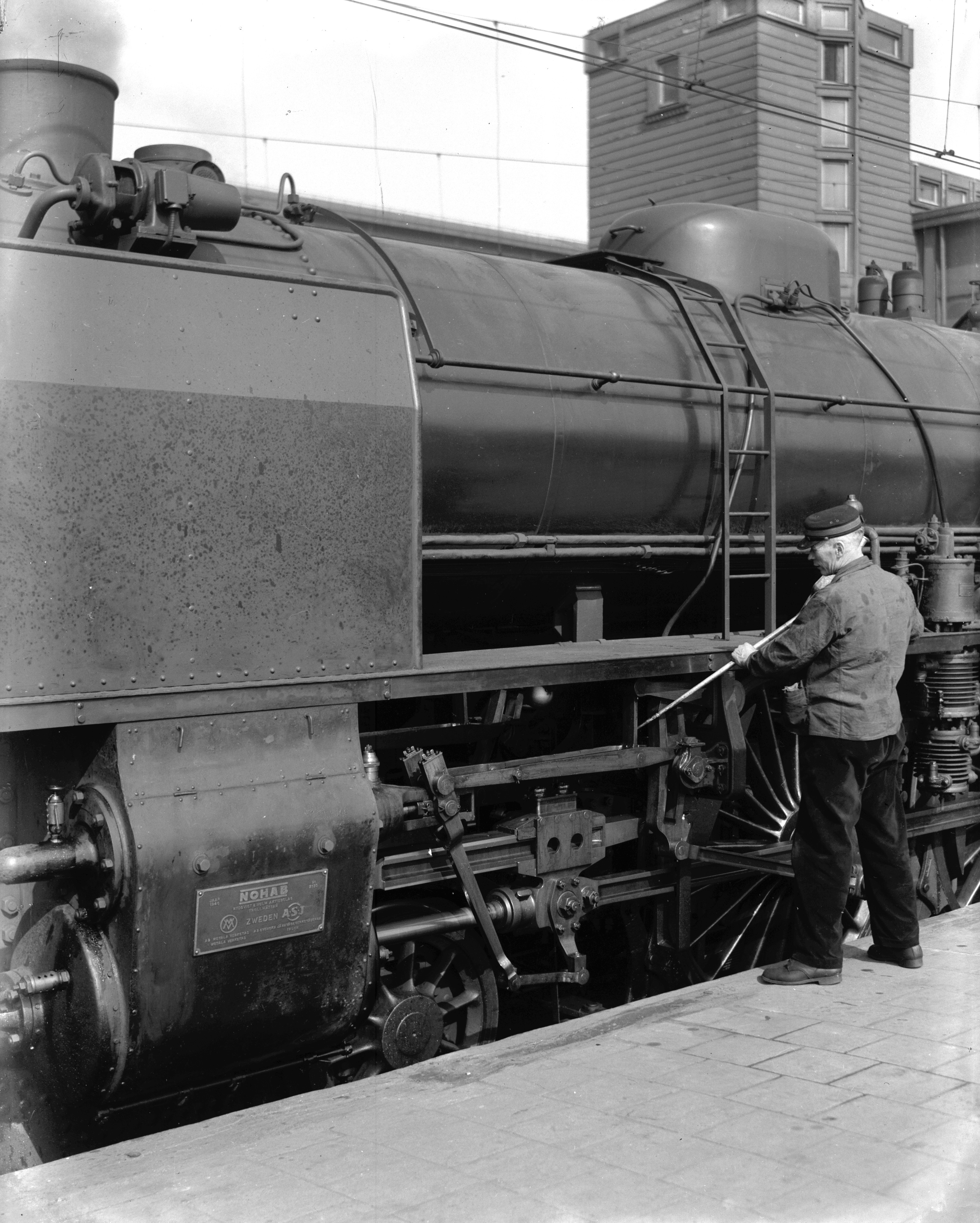
NS 4000 lubricating the running gear. (Between 1946 and 1947)

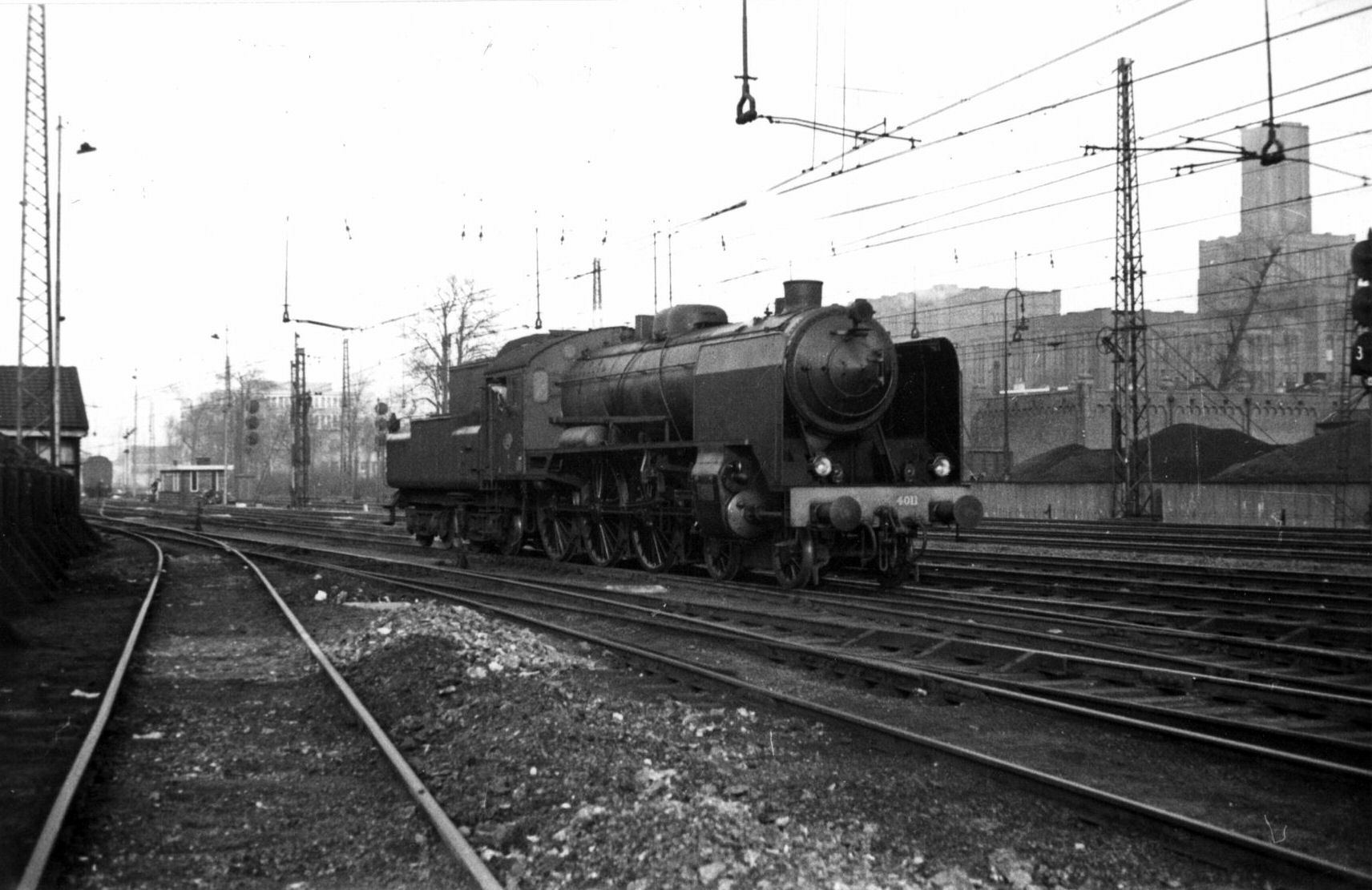
NS 4011 in Utrecht (1950)

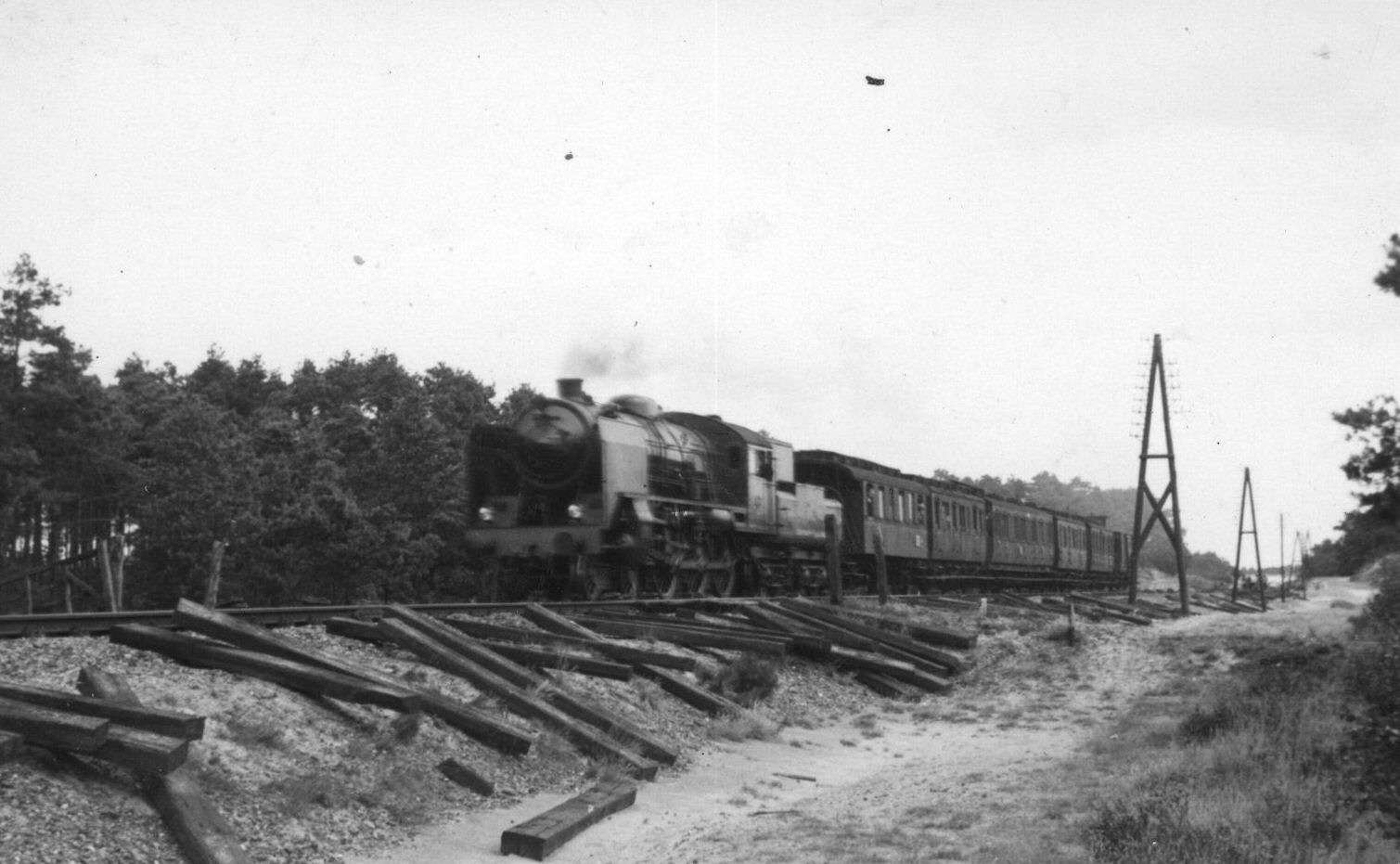
NS 4005 with a passenger train near Nunspeet. (September 1946)

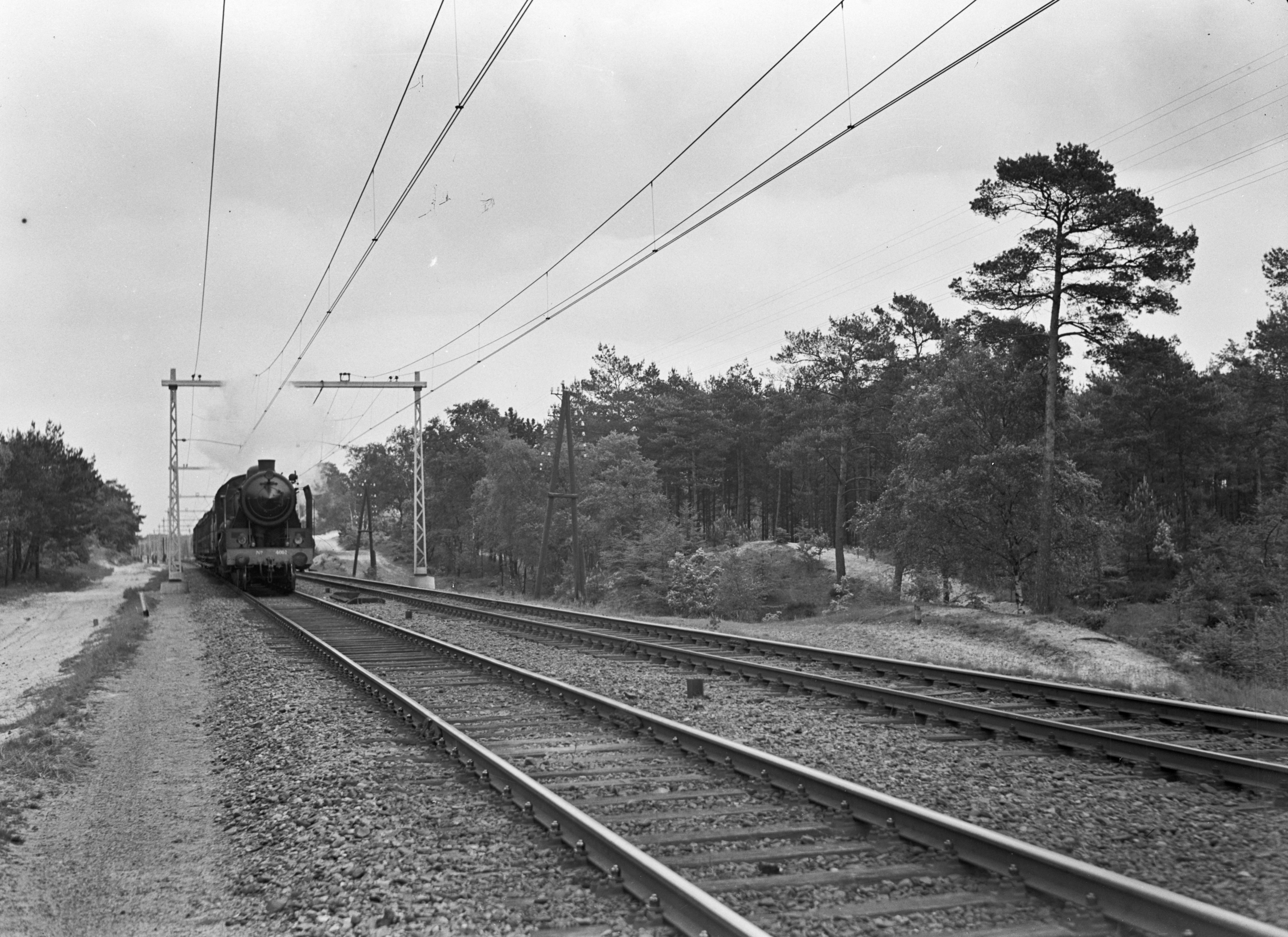
NS 4001 with a train near Hulshorst. (07-06-1951)

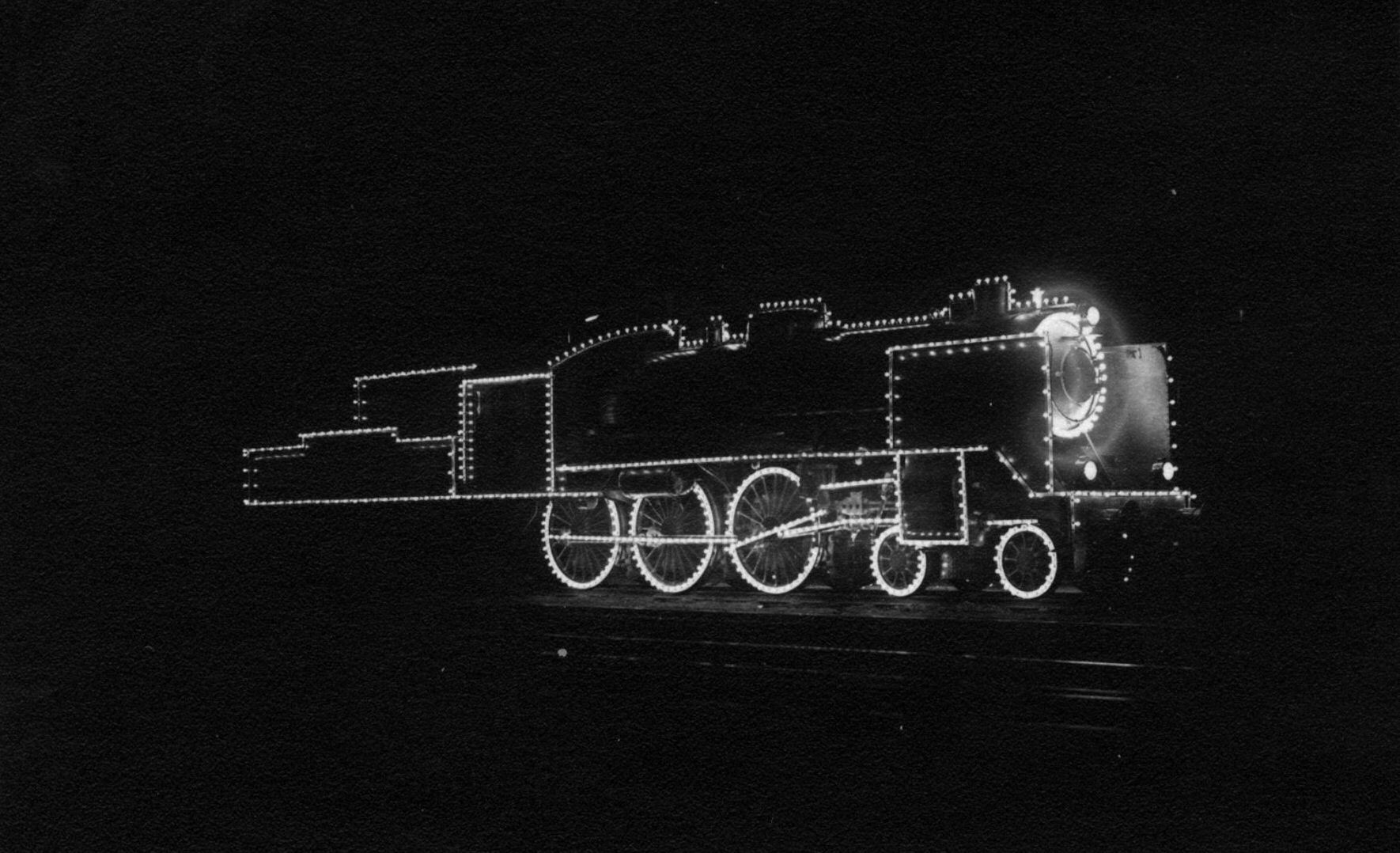
NS 4015 with party lighting. at night. (1946)

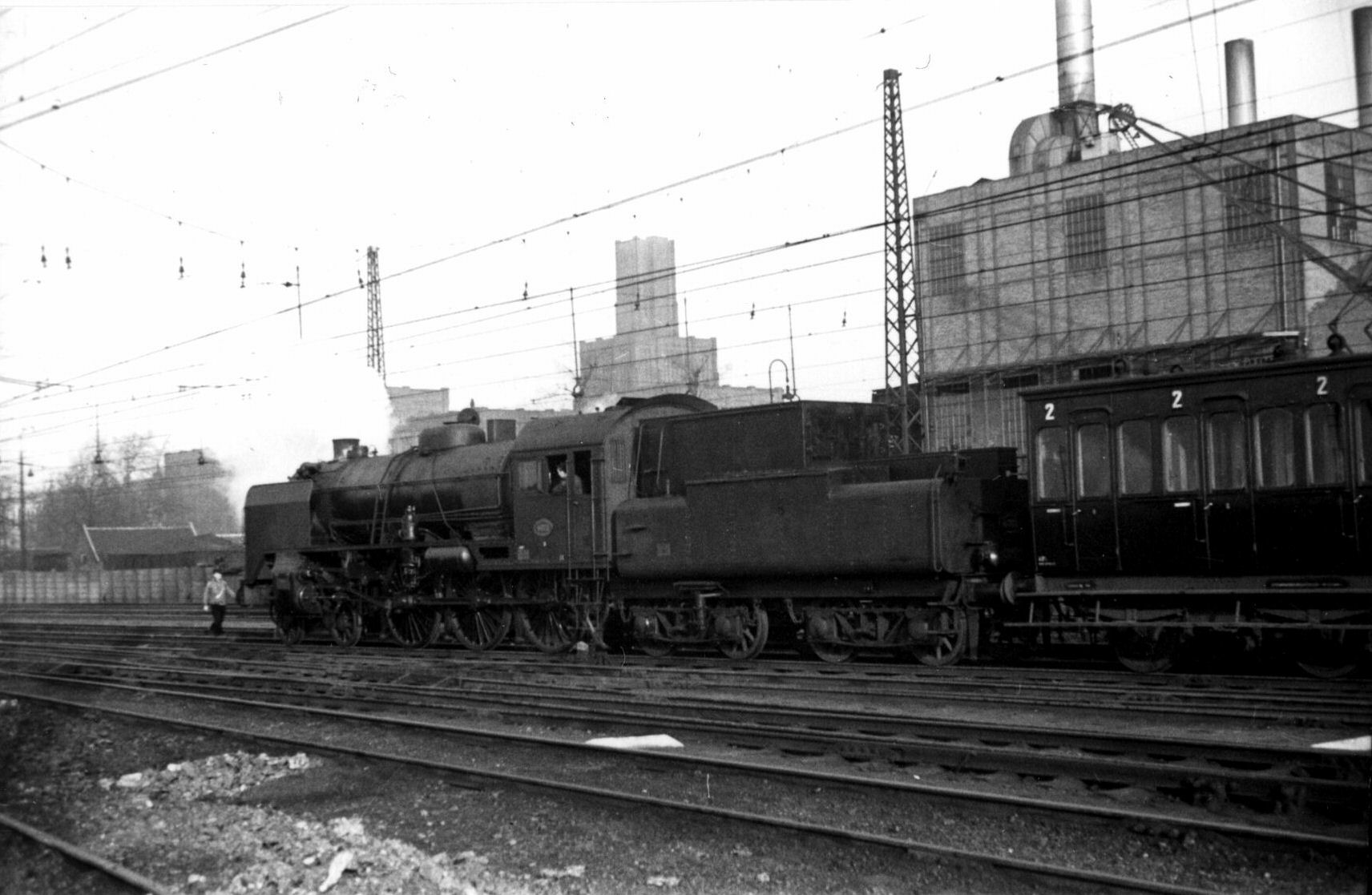
NS 4011 in Utrecht with a passenger train. (1950)

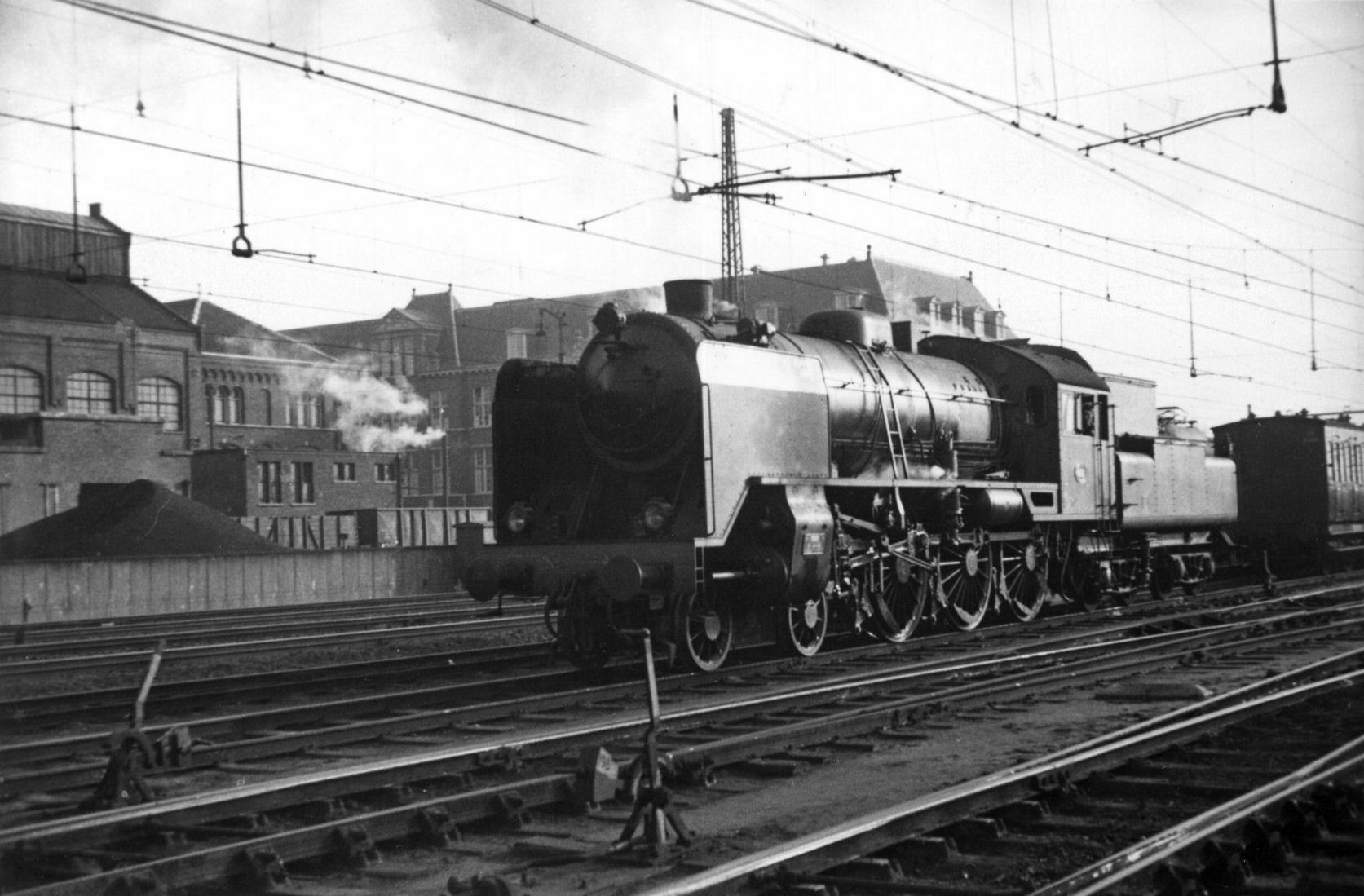
NS 4011 in Utrecht. (1950)

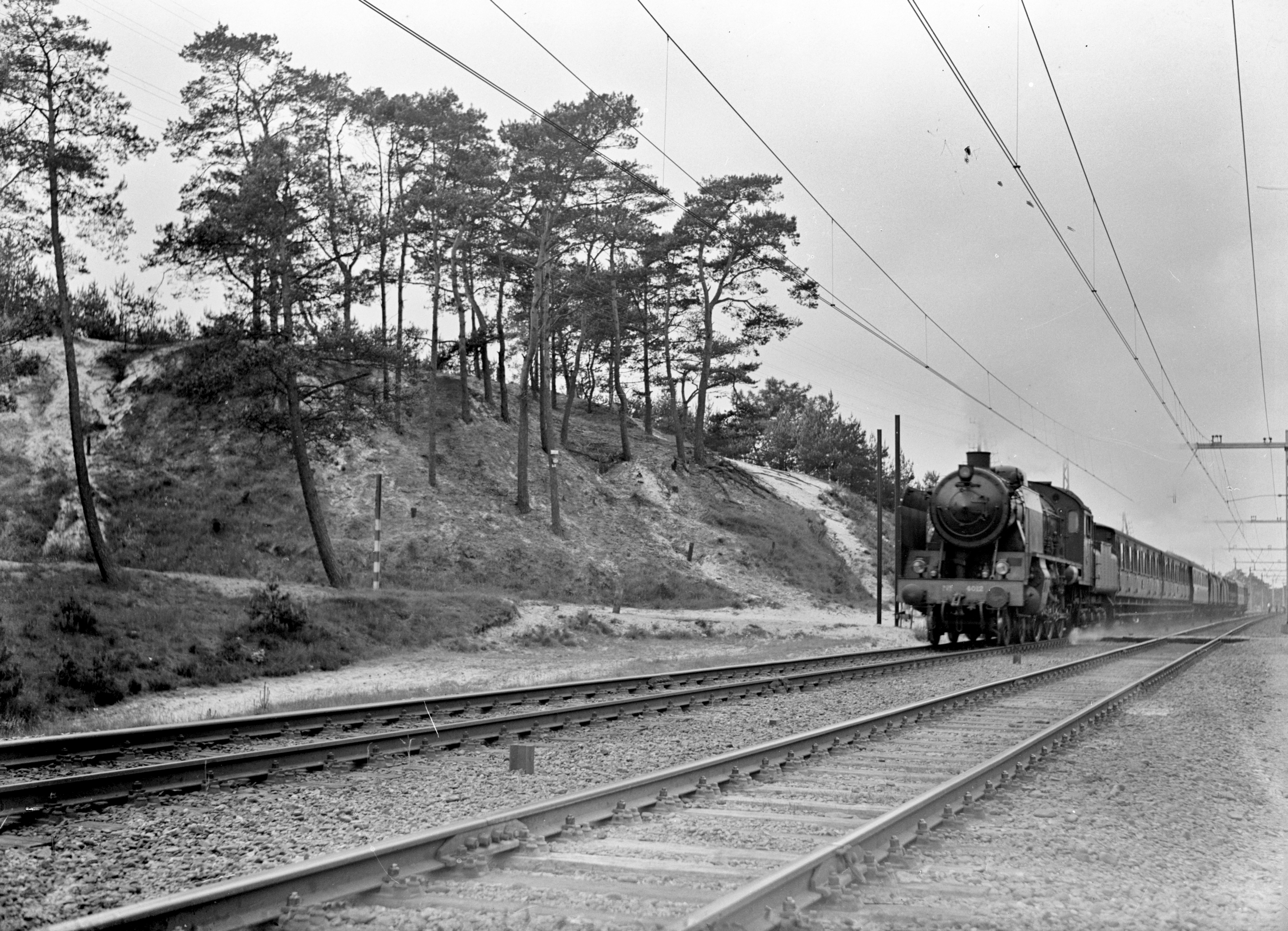
NS 4012 with a train near Hulshorst. (07-06-1951)

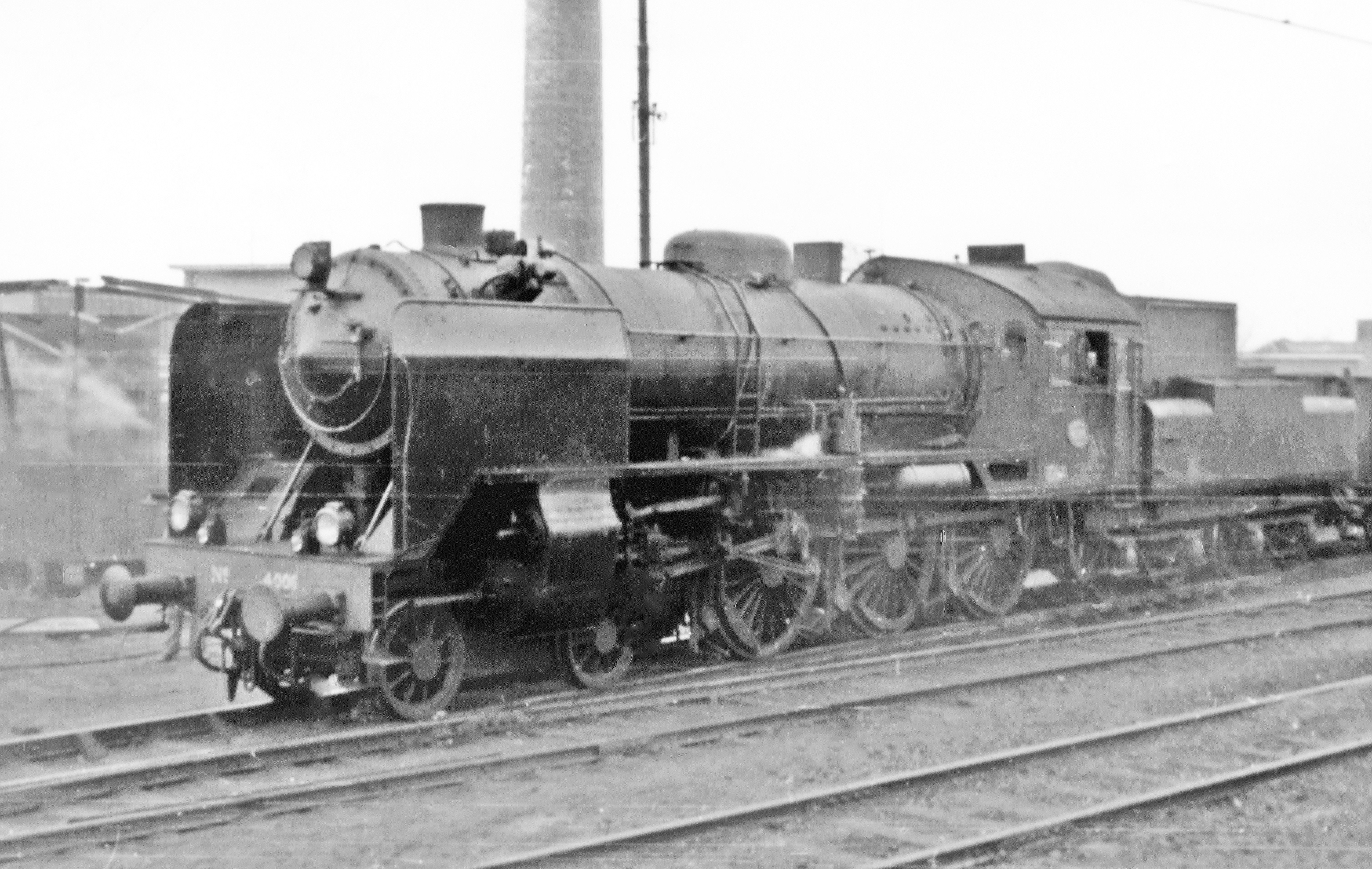
NS 4006 in Schiedam (1953)

== Sources ==
- R.C. Statius Muller, A.J. Veenendaal jr., H. Waldorp: De Nederlandse stoomlocomotieven. Uitg. De Alk, Alkmaar, 2005. ISBN 90 6013 262 9
- H. van Poll: Stoomtractie bij de Nederlandse Spoorwegen 1944 - 1958, Uitg. De Bataafse Leeuw, 1985. ISBN 90 6707 078 5
- H. Waldorp: Onze Nederlandse stoomlocomotieven in woord en beeld, (7e druk) uitgeverij De Alk, Alkmaar, 1986. ISBN 90-6013-947-X.
- Het Utrechts Archief
