= Sanford (surname) =

Sanford is a surname. Notable people with the surname include:

- Adam Sanford (born 1975), Dominican cricketer
- Agnes Sanford (1897–1982), American Christian writer
- Anette Sanford (born 1983), Dominican politician
- Arlene Sanford (fl. 1980s–2020s), American film and television director
- Chance Sanford (born 1972), American baseball player
- Charles S. Sanford Jr. (died 2018), American businessman
- Chris Sanford (born 1968), American retired mixed martial artist
- Christy Sheffield Sanford, American writer
- Claudius Sanford (born 1974), Dominican politician
- Curtis Sanford (born 1979), Canadian ice hockey player
- David C. Sanford (c. 1798–1864), American jurist from Connecticut
- Daymion Sanford (born 2005), American football player
- Denny Sanford (born 1935), American businessman and philanthropist
- Donald Sanford (sprinter) (born 1987), American-Israeli sprinter
- Edmund Sanford (1859–1924), American psychologist
- Edward Sanford (disambiguation), multiple people
- Elias B. Sanford (1843–1932), American clergyman
- Eva Matthews Sanford (1894–1954), American medieval and classical scholar
- Fred Sanford (1919–2011), American baseball player
- Fred Sanford (1947–2000), American musician
- Garwin Sanford, Canadian actor
- Henry Shelton Sanford (1823–1891), American diplomat and businessman, founder of the city of Sanford, Florida.
- Hugh Sanford (MP) (died 1607), English MP and tutor
- Hugh W. Sanford (1879–1961), American businessman and writer from Tennessee
- Isabel Sanford (1917–2004), American actress and comedian
- Jack Sanford (1917–2005), American baseball player
- Jack Sanford (1929–2000), American baseball player
- James Sanford (disambiguation), multiple people
- John A. Sanford (1929–2005), American psychoanalyst and Episcopal priest
- John C. Sanford (born 1950), American plant geneticist and advocate of intelligent design and young earth creationism
- John E. Sanford (1830–1907), American politician in Massachusetts
- John Elroy Sanford (1922–1991), birth name of American comedian Redd Foxx
- John F. A. Sanford (1806–1857), one party to the U.S. Supreme Court case of Dred Scott v. Sandford [sic]
- John Langton Sanford (1824–1877), English historical writer
- John Sanford (author) (1904–2003), American author and screenwriter, born Julian Lawrence Shapiro
- John Sanford (governor) (1605–1653), founder of Portsmouth, Rhode Island, USA
- John Sanford (1803) (1803–1857), American politician from New York
- John Sanford (1851) (1851–1939), American politician from New York
- John W. A. Sanford (1798–1870), American politician from Georgia
- Katherine Sanford (1915–2005), American cancer biologist
- Kiki Sanford, American neurophysiologist and science communicator
- Leonard Cutler Sanford (1868–1950), American surgeon and ornithologist
- Lillias Rumsey Sanford (1850–1940), American school founder
- Linda Sanford (born 1953), American technology executive
- Louis Childs Sanford (1867–1948), American Episcopal bishop
- Lucius Sanford (born 1956), American American football player
- Maria Sanford (1836–1920), American educator
- Margaret Rose Sanford (1918–2006), American politician from North Carolina
- Mark Sanford (born 1960), American politician from South Carolina
- Mike Sanford (born 1955), American football coach
- Mike Sanford Jr. (born 1982), American football coach
- Mitchell Sanford (1799–1861), American politician from New York
- Nathan Sanford (1777–1838), American politician from New York
- Nehemiah Curtis Sanford (1792–1841), American industrialist and politician
- Reuben Sanford (1780–1855), American politician from New York
- Richard K. Sanford (1822–1895), American politician from New York
- Roscoe Frank Sanford (1883–1958), American astronomer
- Scott Sanford (born 1963), American politician, accountant, and Baptist clergyman
- Taylor Sanford (1908–1966), American baseball player, coach, and college athletics administrator
- Terry Sanford (1917–1998), American politician from North Carolina
- Vincent Sanford (born 1990), American basketball player
- William Ayshford Sanford (1818–1902), naturalist and Colonial Secretary of Western Australia
- William Eli Sanford (1838–1899), Canadian businessman, philanthropist, and politician
- Winifred Sanford (1890–1983), American writer
- Worrel Sanford, Dominican politician
- Zach Sanford (born 1994), American ice hockey player

== Fictional characters ==
- Fred G. Sanford, of the TV series Sanford and Son
- Lamont Sanford, of the TV series Sanford and Son, portrayed by Demond Wilson

== See also ==
- Sandford (surname)
