= Zandvoort (disambiguation) =

Zandvoort is a town in North Holland, the Netherlands.

Zandvoort may also refer to:

- Buttinge en Zandvoort, former town, now part of Veere, the Netherlands
- Circuit Zandvoort (previously Circuit Park Zandvoort), motorsport race track
- Zandvoort aan Zee railway station
- Haarlem-Zandvoort Spoorweg Maatschappij, railway company (1880–1889)
- The Misadventure of a French Gentleman Without Pants at the Zandvoort Beach, 1905 film
- Reinard Zandvoort, Dutch linguist (1894–1990)

== See also ==
- Zandvoorde, Zonnebeke, village in Belgium
- Sandford (disambiguation)
