= Sandyford (disambiguation) =

Sandyford is a suburb of Dublin, Ireland.

Sandyford may also refer to:

- Sandyford, Glasgow, Scotland
- Sandyford, Newcastle upon Tyne, England
- Sandyford, Staffordshire, Stoke-on-Trent, England
- Sandefjord, Norway

== See also ==
- Sandford (disambiguation)
- Sandiford (disambiguation)
- Sanford (disambiguation)
- Standiford (disambiguation)
- Zandvoorde (disambiguation)
