= Stamford =

Stamford may refer to:

== Places ==
=== United Kingdom ===
- Stamford, Lincolnshire, a town and civil parish in England
  - Stamford (UK Parliament constituency), a former constituency in Lincolnshire, England
- Stamford, Northumberland, a hamlet in Rennington parish
- Stamford Brook, a brook in West London

=== United States ===
- Stamford, Connecticut, the second largest city in the state of Connecticut
- Stamford, Nebraska, a village
- Stamford, New York, a town
- Stamford (village), New York, a village in Delaware county, New York
- Stamford, South Dakota
- Stamford, Texas, a city
- Stamford, Vermont, a town
- Lake Stamford, a reservoir in Texas

=== Elsewhere ===
- Stamford, Queensland, Australia, a town and location
- Stamford Township, Ontario, a former township first in Upper Canada, then in Canada

== People ==
- Stamford Raffles (1781–1826), English statesman and founder of Singapore
- Stamford Raffles-Flint (1847–1925), Archdeacon of Cornwall

== Educational institutions ==
- Stamford University (Bangladesh)
- Stamford University (Thailand)
- University of Stamford, Lincolnshire, England (1333–1335)
- Stamford School, an English public school in Stamford, Lincolnshire
- Stamford American International School, Singapore
- Stamford High School (disambiguation)

== Transportation ==
- Stamford Canal, Lincolnshire
- Stamford Railway Station, Lincolnshire
- Stamford Road, Singapore
- Stamford Street, London, England
- Stamford Transportation Center, called "Stamford" by railway companies, in Stamford, Connecticut

== Other uses ==
- Earl of Stamford, created in 1628, an extinct title in the Peerage of England
- Stamford A.F.C., an association football club in Stamford, Lincolnshire, England
- Stamford Arms, a public house in Stalybridge, Greater Manchester, England
- Swissôtel The Stamford, a hotel in Singapore
- USS Stamford (PF-95), an authorized but never built US Navy frigate

== See also ==
- Samford (disambiguation)
- Stamford Bridge (disambiguation)
- Stanford (disambiguation)
