= Stanford (name) =

Stanford is both a surname, and a masculine given name of English origin.

== People ==
Notable people with the name include:

=== Surnamed ===
- Stanford (surname)

==== By title ====
- Governor Stanford (disambiguation)
- Senator Stanford (disambiguation)

=== Given named ===
People with the given name "Stanford" include:

- Stanford Callender, Trinidad and Tobago politician
- Stanford Keglar (1985–present), American football player.
- Stanford Moore (1913–1982), American biochemist. He shared a Nobel Prize in Chemistry in 1972.
- Stanford Morse (1926–2002), American politician
- Stanford Parris (1929–2010), American politician
- Stanford Samuels (disambiguation)
  - Stanford Samuels (born 1980), American football player
  - Stanford Samuels III (born 1999), American football player
- Stanford White (1853 – 1906), American architect

== Fictional characters ==
- Stanford "Stan" Edgar, a character from The Boys, played by Giancarlo Esposito
- Stanford Filbrick "Ford" Pines, a character from Gravity Falls, played by J. K. Simmons

== See also ==
- Stanford (disambiguation)
