= Stanford House =

Stanford House may refer to:

- Stanford House, 19, Castle Gate, a house in the city of Nottingham, England, United Kingdom
- Stanford House, 6, Stanford Street, a former warehouse in the city of Nottingham, England, United Kingdom
- George Stanford Farm, a house in Boston Township, Ohio, United States

== See also ==
- Stanford (disambiguation)
