= Sanford =

Sanford may refer to:

== People ==
- Sanford (given name), including a list of people with the name
- Sanford (surname), including a list of people with the name

== Places ==
=== United States ===
- Sanford, Alabama, a town in Covington County
- Sanford, Colorado, a statutory town in Conejos County
- Sanford, Florida, the county seat of Seminole County
  - Orlando Sanford International Airport, in Sanford, Florida
- Sanford, Georgia, an unincorporated community
- Sanford, Kansas, an unincorporated community in Pawnee County
- Sanford, Maine, a city in York County
  - Sanford (CDP), Maine, a former census-designated place in downtown Sanford
- Sanford, Michigan, a village in Midland County
- Sanford, Mississippi, an unincorporated community in Covington County
- Sanford, New York, a town in Broome County
- Sanford, North Carolina, a city in Lee County
- Sanford, Texas, a town in Hutchinson County
- Sanford, Virginia, a census-designated place in Accomack County
- Mount Sanford (Alaska), a shield volcano in the Wrangell Volcanic Field
- Sanford Stadium, Athens, Georgia, football venue at the University of Georgia

=== Canada ===
- Sanford, Manitoba, an unincorporated community in Macdonald rural municipality

=== United Kingdom ===
- Sanford Housing Co-operative, a housing cooperative in London

=== Moon ===
- Sanford (crater), a lunar impact crater on the Moon's far side

== Science ==
- Sanford's bowerbird (Archboldia sanfordi), a bird species in Papua New Guinea
- Sanford's brown lemur (Eulemur sanfordi), a primate species in Madagascar
- Sanford's sea eagle (Haliaeetus sanfordi), a bird species endemic to the Solomon Islands
- Sanford's white-eye (Woodfordia lacertosa), a species of bird endemic to the Solomon Islands

== Other uses ==
- Sanford (TV series), a 1980–81 American TV series, a revival of Sanford and Son
- Sanford Health, a health-care system based in Sioux Falls, South Dakota, United States
- Sanford L.P., a unit of Newell Rubbermaid that manufactures writing products
- Sanford's Opera Troupe, an American blackface minstrel troupe, 1853–1857
- Sanford (fisheries), a New Zealand fishing company

== See also ==
- Sanford station (disambiguation)
- Sandford (disambiguation)
- Samford (disambiguation)
- Stanford (disambiguation)
