= Stanford (disambiguation) =

Stanford is a university in northern California, United States.

Stanford may also refer to:

== Places ==
=== South Africa ===
- Stanford, Western Cape

=== United Kingdom ===
- Stanford, Bedfordshire
- Stanford-le-Hope, Essex
- Stanford, Kent
- Stanford, Norfolk
- Stanford, Northamptonshire
  - Stanford-on-Avon
- Stanford on Soar, Nottinghamshire
- Stanford in the Vale, Oxfordshire
- Stanford, Shropshire, a UK location
- Stanford on Teme, Worcestershire

=== United States ===
- Stanford, California, a census-designated place
  - Stanford (Caltrain station)
- Stanford, Idaho, an unincorporated community
- Stanford, Indiana, a census-designated place
- Stanford, Illinois, a village
- Stanford, Kentucky, a city
- Stanford, Minnesota, a township
- Stanford, Montana, a town
- Stanford, New York, a town

== Facilities and structures ==
- Stanford Hall, Leicestershire, UK, a country house
  - Stanford Park, its grounds
  - Stanford Reservoir, nearby
- Stanford Hall, Nottinghamshire, UK, a country house
- Stanford Lake College, a high school in Limpopo Province, South Africa
- Stanford Mansion, a mansion in Sacramento, California

== People and characters ==
- Stanford (name), a list of persons and fictional characters with the name

== Sports ==
- Stanford Cardinal, the nickname of the athletic teams at Stanford University
- Stanford Super Series, a cricket tournament
- Stanford 20/20, a cricket tournament

== Other uses ==
- Stanford Financial Group
- The Stanford prison experiment, a social psychology experiment conducted in 1971

== See also ==
- Stanford House (disambiguation)
- Samford (disambiguation)
- Sanford (disambiguation)
- Stamford (disambiguation)
