= The Stars Fell on Henrietta =

1995 film by James Keach

- Theatrical release poster
- Directed by: James Keach
- Written by: Philip Railsback
- Based on: "Luck" by Winifred Sanford
- Produced by: Clint Eastwood; David Valdes
- Starring: Robert Duvall; Aidan Quinn; Frances Fisher; Brian Dennehy
- Cinematography: Bruce Surtees
- Edited by: Joel Cox
- Music by: David Benoit
- Production company: Malpaso Productions
- Distributed by: Warner Bros.
- Release date: September 15, 1995
- Running time: 109 minutes
- Country: United States
- Language: English
- Budget: $13 million
- Box office: $99,318

The Stars Fell on Henrietta is a 1995 American drama film from Warner Bros., directed by James Keach and produced by Clint Eastwood. The film is based on a short story written by Winifred Sanford titled "Luck". The script for the film was penned by Philip Railsback, who is Sanford's grandson.

== Plot ==
The setting is early America during the oil boom. An elderly, down on his luck 'oil man', Mr. Cox, finds himself in the town of Henrietta. Using unconventional methods, he convinces himself and local Don Day that there is oil on Day's land. The financially strapped Day puts everything into finding oil, but at what cost?

== Cast ==
- Robert Duvall as Mr. Cox
- Aidan Quinn as Don Day
- Frances Fisher as Cora Day
- Brian Dennehy as Big Dave McDermot
- Billy Bob Thornton as Roy
- Lexi Randall as Beatric Day
- Kaytlyn Knowles as Pauline Day
- Francesca Eastwood as Mary Day (as Francesca Ruth Eastwood)
- Joe Stevens as Big Dave's Driver
- Victor Wong as Henry Nakai
- Paul Lazar as Seymour
- Spencer Garrett as Delbert Tims
- Park Overall as Shirl
- Zach Grenier as Larry Ligstow
- Wayne Dehart as Robert
- Woody Watson as Jack Sterling
- Rodger Boyce as P.G. Pratt
- George Haynes as Stratmeyer
- Robert Westenberg as Mr. Rumsfelk
- Landon Peterson as Raymond Rumsfelk
- Richard Lineback as Les Furrows
- Dylan Baker as Alex Wilde
- Cliff Stephens as Arnold Humphries
- Rob Campbell as Kid
- Tom Aldredge as Grizzled Old Man
- Jerry Haynes as Farmer #2
- Robert A. Burns as Farmer #3
- Blue Deckert as Farmer #4

== Production ==
Filming took place in Anson, Texas and Bartlett, Texas on a budget of $13,000,000.

== Reception ==
The film received mostly mixed reviews, holding only a 40% on Rotten Tomatoes based on 10 reviews with a mean of 5.4 of a possible 10, though Robert Duvall's performance was widely praised. Roger Ebert of the Chicago Sun-Times wrote, "The movie may be worth seeing for (Robert Duvall's) performance, but the story itself is disappointing; it seems to travel around the same track once too often, and when the payoff comes, it seems short-circuited." Kenneth Turan of the Los Angeles Times wrote, "Duvall's performance, however, is frankly on a different level than anything else in the film...With his innate ability to create people whole, to make his familiar mannerisms and gestures work effectively in every situation, Duvall is an actor to wonder at. Although it is not within his power to save the picture."
