= Central High School (Duluth, Minnesota) =

Duluth High School

Coordinates: 46.7891063°N 92.0999118°W

Duluth Central High School
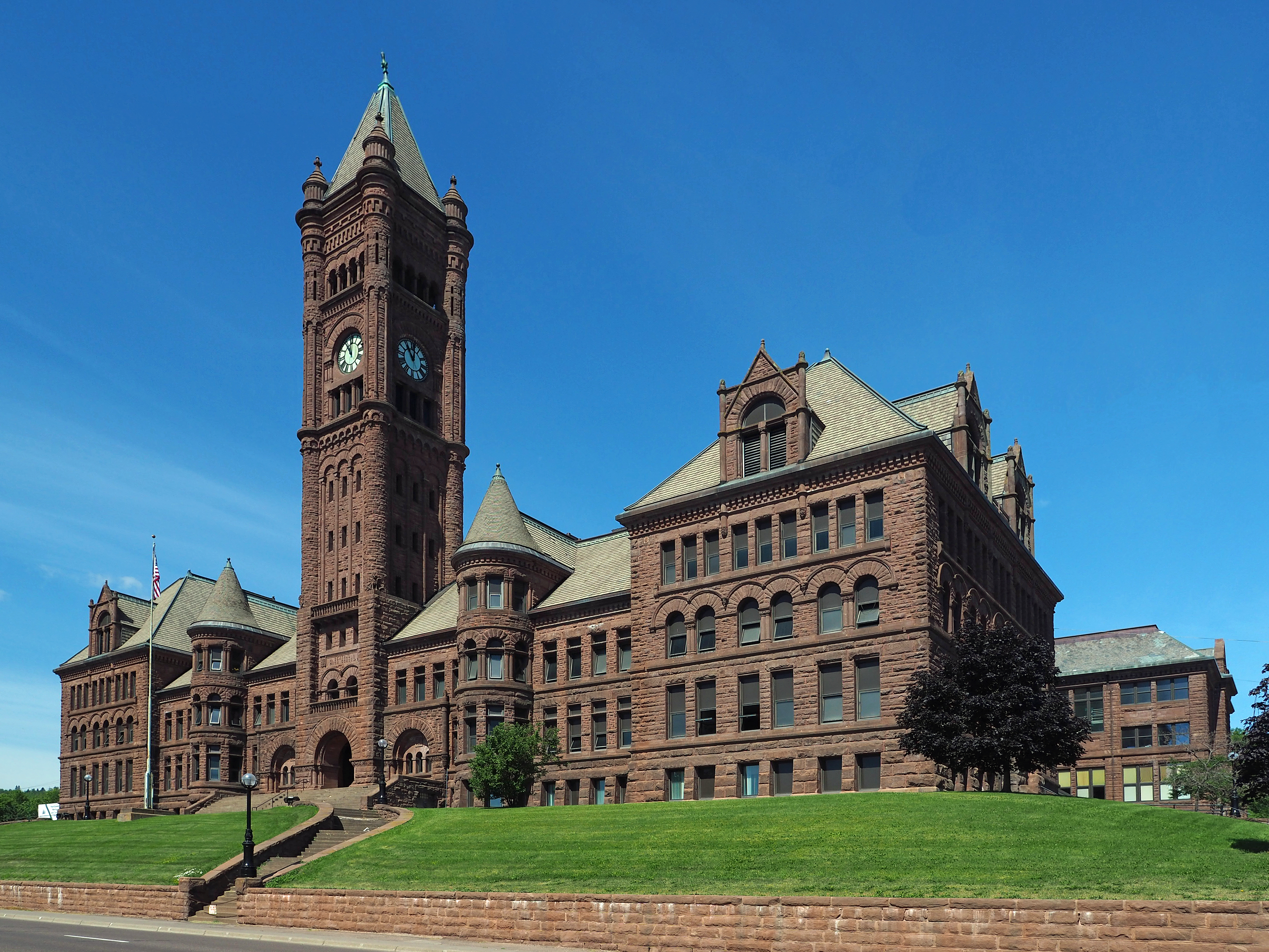
- Central High School from the east
- 215 N. 1st Avenue E., Duluth, Minnesota; Duluth, Minnesota; United States

Information
- Type: Public
- Established: 1893; 133 years ago
- Closed: 2011; 15 years ago
- Language: English
- Colors: Red and White
- Song: Hurrah - For the Red and White!
- Mascot: Trojan
- Team name: Trojans
- Rivals: Duluth East High School and Denfeld High School
- Yearbook: Central Zenith
- Central High School
- U.S. National Register of Historic Places
- Location within Minnesota Location within the United States
- Area: 2.754 acres (1.115 ha)
- Built: 1892; 134 years ago
- Architects: Palmer, Hall, & Hunt; Traphagen & Fitzpatrick
- Architectural style: Richardsonian Romanesque
- NRHP reference No.: 72001488
- Added to NRHP: November 9, 1972

Duluth Central High School, also referred to as Central High School, was a secondary school in Duluth, Minnesota. The original building at the intersection of Lake Avenue and Second Street first opened in 1893 and closed in 1971, being used as office space until it was converted to apartments in 2024. On October 19, 2004, this building was given the official name Historic Old Central High School.

In 1971, a new Central High School building was erected near the Central Entrance and Pecan Avenue. At the end of the 2010-2011 school year, the new Duluth Central High School closed its doors. This building was demolished in 2022, with the site planned to become a large housing development.

== History ==
=== Historic Old Central High School ===
==== Description ====
The Historic Old Central High School is a massive, three-story Richardsonian Romanesque building of Lake Superior Brownstone. Its footprint is an inverted "T" shape. The clock tower is centrally placed, with the main entrance through a massive arch at its base. The clock faces are 10 feet (3.0 m) in diameter. Two small turrets flank the clock tower. The entrance arches are echoed by arched window openings on the second floor, the dormers, and the around the clock faces.

The interior originally contained 11 classrooms on the ground floor and 10 on the second floor, a library with a large fireplace, offices, and a two-story auditorium. Large double staircases of slate and iron led to the upper floors. The third floor contained laboratories, shop classrooms, a gymnasium, a music room, and a teaching museum. Much of the interior was altered in later years due to the changing needs and new safety standards of the school. A wing containing an updated gymnasium and chemistry classrooms was later added to the north.

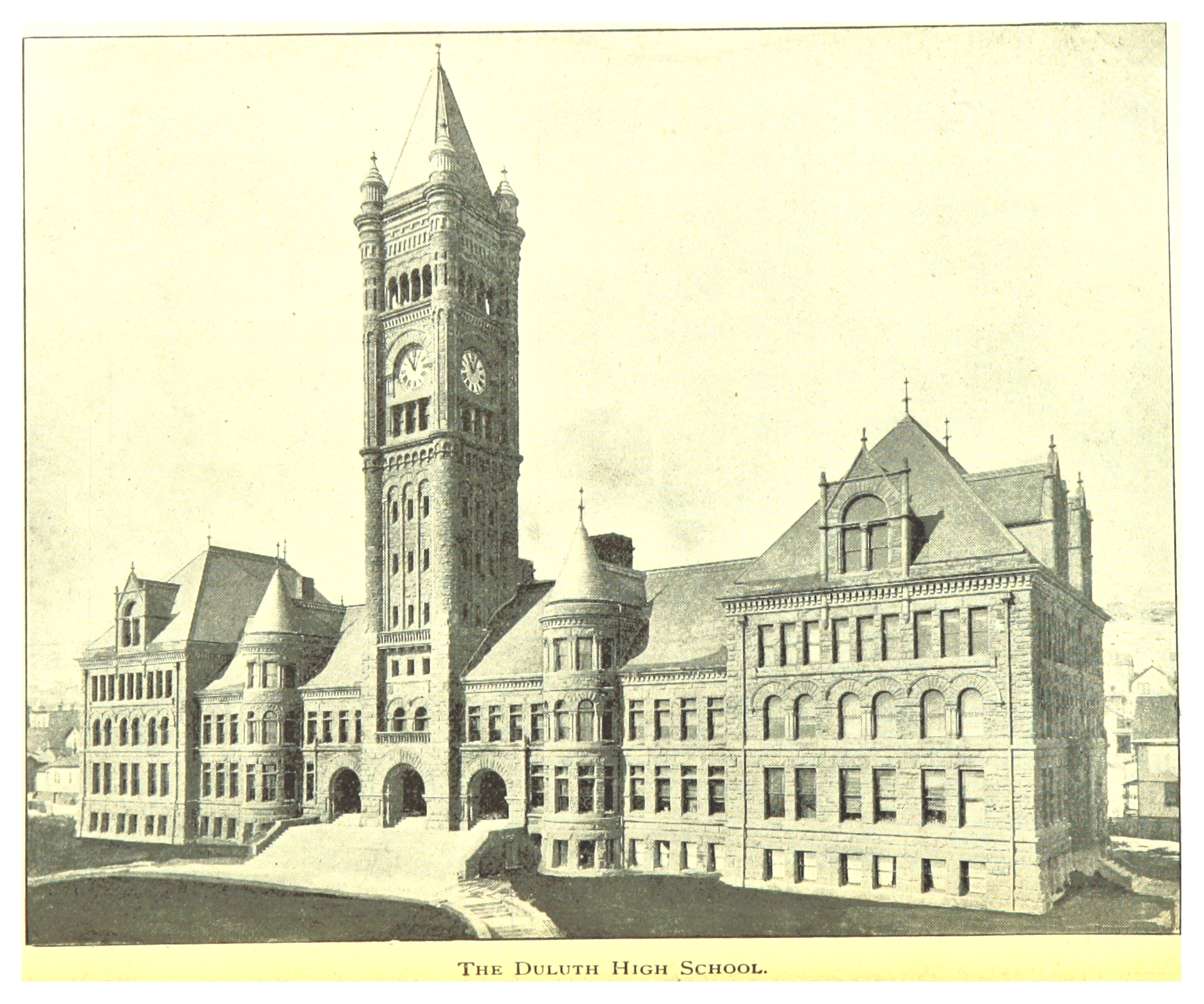
The high school in 1893

==== History ====
The first Central High School, inspired by Pittsburgh's Allegheny County Courthouse, was designed by the Duluth architectural firm of Palmer & Hall, with most of the design executed by William Hunt, who would later become a partner in the firm. The cornerstone was laid in 1891 at a ceremony attended by roughly 7,000 people. The clock was manufactured by E. Howard & Co. of Boston and installed in 1893. Two years later, five bells, cast by the Buckeye Bell Foundry of Cincinnati, Ohio, were added to the clock to chime the Westminster Quarters. From 1898 to 1942 a 17-foot (5.2 m) cannon stood on the high school's steps, a prize captured from the Spanish cruiser Almirante Oquendo during the Spanish–American War in 1898. As America entered World War II the cannon was donated to a scrap metal drive and melted down.

The building was eventually was viewed as antiquated and unsafe, and the school moved in 1971 (see The new Central High School). Following this move, the building was retained for use by the city, mostly being used as office space and hosting a small alternative school, Unity High School, and the 1890s Classroom Museum. It was added to the National Register of Historic Places in 1972; the nomination described it as "one of the state's finest examples of Richardsonian Romanesque architecture". The building was officially renamed the Historic Old Central High School on October 19, 2004.

In 2020, Historic Old Central High School was listed for sale by the Duluth School Board. Saturday Properties, a St. Louis Park-based developer, bought it in 2022 for $3 million, and began converting the building into apartments. The conversion, which preserved original features such as the auditorium (reconfigured as a common space), hallways, and lockers, was completed in 2024. Historic Old Central High School now contains 122 units, ranging from studios to penthouses.

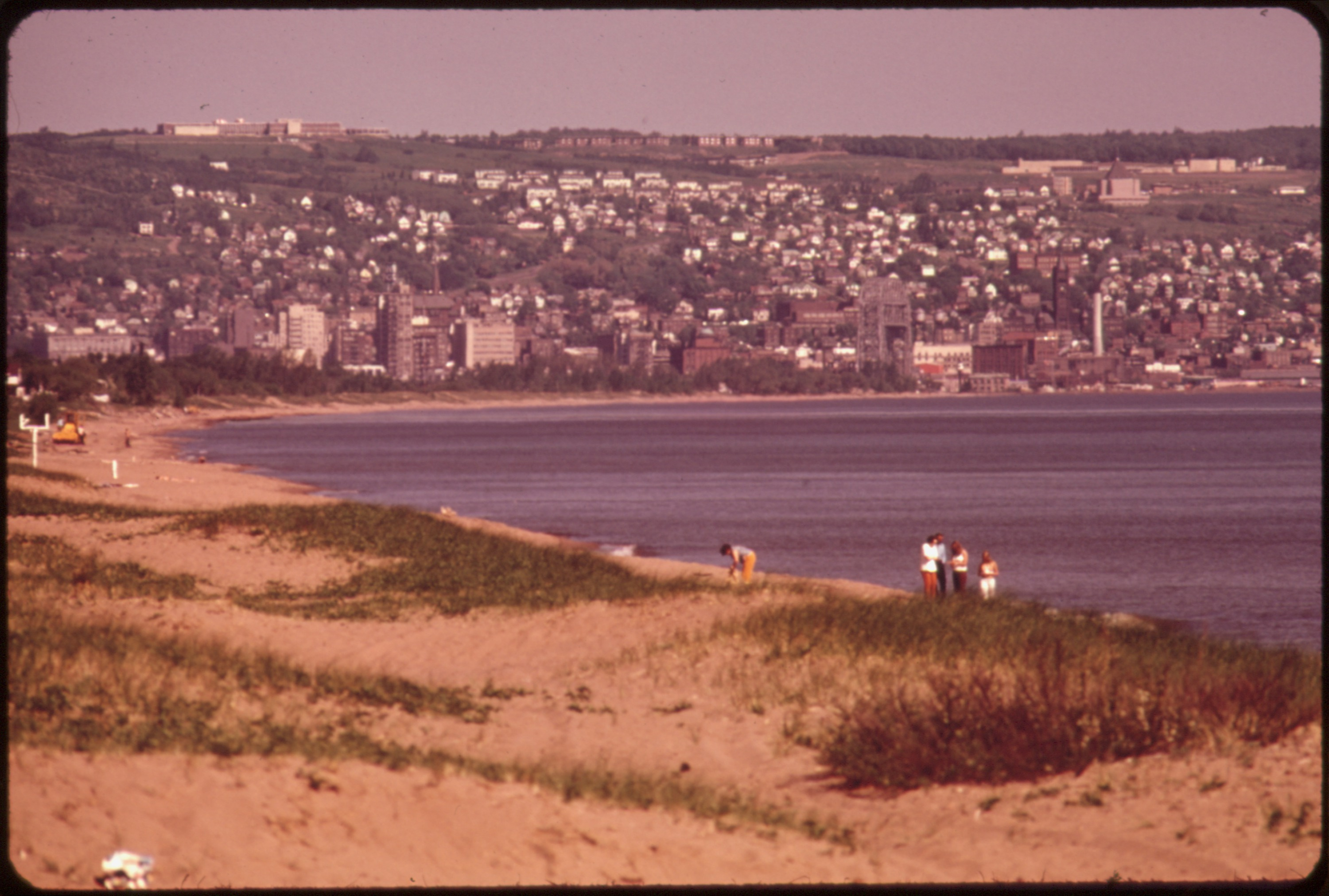
The new Central High School can be seen in the top left of this 1973 DOCUMERICA view of Duluth from Minnesota Point.

=== The new Central High School ===
Due to age and safety conditions, the Duluth School Board decided in 1970 that it would have to build a new school to replace the Historic Old Central High School. In 1971, the new Central High School building was built on top of the hill, about 1.6 miles northwest of the original structure, and the school moved there. The new school was situated on a campus of over 70 acres, with commanding views of Duluth and Lake Superior, and featured a football field. Originally serving grades 9-12, it added seventh and eighth grades after the closure of Washington Junior High School in 1992.

In 2007, the Duluth School Board announced that they would support the long-range Red plan for the district which would close Duluth Central and keep a renovated Ordean Middle School (now Duluth East High School) and Duluth Denfeld High School as the only two high schools in Duluth. 2011 was the last graduating class of Duluth Central High School. The grounds and the buildings would remain empty until sold by the school district.

In November 2013 the Duluth City Council met to finalize plans to rezone the land from an R-1 (residential zone) to a commercial C zone paving the way for ISD 709 to sell Central High School to potential land developers for commercial purposes. In December 2014, the sale of the property was announced.

In 2022 Chester Creek View LLC purchased the majority of the property, including the school building, for $8 million. Demolition of the building began on November 14, 2022. In February 2024, the Duluth City Council voted in support of a $500 million redevelopment plan. It would include 1,300 housing units and commercial space. The developer is Lazar Ostreicher of Monsey, New York. The school district retained a small part of the property for possible office construction.

== Athletics ==
Big red was given to Duluth Central High School teams until 1930. In that year, students decided to change the name to the "Trojans". This was done through a contest in which all students could participate. The Trojan would remain the symbol and name for Central teams until the school's closing.

Central claimed numerous Minnesota State High School League state championships, with most of them coming in basketball, skiing, and ski jumping. Central had many state championships in winter sports, including the individual downhill skiing champion 18 times between 1932 and 1962 and team champion six times. Central also had a dominant ski jumping program with eight state ski jumping champions between 1939 and 1968 and 19 team championships between 1933 and 1974. Central won the state debate title in 1922. Central was state champion in boys basketball in 1950, 1961, 1971 (the first year of two classes, A and AA), and 1979. Central was state champion in boys cross country running six times between 1943 and 1957. Central won three consecutive boys golf titles from 1946 to 1948. Central was boys track and field state champion four times in 1923, 1930, 1935, and 1936.

== Notable alumni ==
Alumni	Occupation
Gary Doty	former Duluth mayor
Robert R. Gilruth	aerospace engineer and an aviation/space pioneer
Earl B. Gustafson	judge, lawyer, and politician
Richard H. Hanson	politician
Terry Kunze	professional basketball player
Don LaFontaine	voice actor who recorded more than 5,000 film trailers
Elmer McDevitt	football player and coach
Ted McKnight	football player
Lorenzo Music	actor, voice actor, writer, producer, and musician
Ethel Ray Nance	civil rights activist
Don Ness	former Duluth mayor
Jim Ojala	special effects and makeup artist, screenwriter, and film director
Winifred Sanford	writer
Jordan Schmidt	music producer, songwriter
Sam Solon	politician
Wellyn Totman	Hollywood screenwriter
Aileen Geving	Winter Olympian (Curling)
