= Buttinge en Zandvoort =

Coordinates: 51°31′06″N 3°34′23″E

Buttinge en Zandvoort (or Buttinge c.a.) is a former municipality in the Dutch province of Zeeland, which existed until 1816. In that year, it was made a part of the municipality of Grijpskerke, and it is now part of the municipality of Veere.

The only recorded village in the municipality was Buttinge. Zandvoort was a former hamlet between Buttinge and Middelburg. It may have been a larger village in medieval times, but around the middle of the 19th century, there were only a former mansion and a population of about 50 left.

Buttinge c.a. was a free estate before the introduction of the municipal system around 1800. As such, it automatically became a municipality, albeit sparsely populated. The estate used the following coat of arms: 'or, a double-headed eagle gules'. Upon this CoA a flag was designed, using the same eagle, but on a horizontally divided yellow and red flag. The eagle itself has then mirrored colours.

In 1816, Buttinge en Zandvoort merged with Grijpskerke en Poppendamme and Hoogelande into the new municipality 'Grijpskerke', which was by far the largest settlement. Grijpskerke in turn merged into Mariekerke in 1966 and finally, in 1997, into Veere.
