= Sanford station =

Sanford station may refer to:

- Sanford station (Amtrak), an Amtrak Auto Train station
- Sanford station (Atlantic Coast Line), a former rail station
- Sanford station (SunRail), a commuter rail station
- Sanford station (Danbury and Norwalk Railroad), a former rail station
- Sanford station, a remote flag stop in Quebec served by VIA Rail's Montreal–Jonquière train

== See also ==
- Sanford (disambiguation)
- Stanford station, Caltrain station in Palo Alto, California, United States
