= David Valdes =

American film producer (born 1950)

- Born: August 12, 1950 (age 76); Los Angeles, California, U.S.
- Education: University of California, Los Angeles
- Occupation: Film producer

David Valdes (born August 12, 1950, in Los Angeles) is an American film producer known for producing 17 films with Clint Eastwood, 4 films with Francis Ford Coppola, a couple with Kevin Costner and a few special titles he proudly calls classics: The Green Mile and Unforgiven.

== Career ==
David Valdes earned a Bachelor of Theater Arts degree from UCLA and began his film career as an assistant director alongside such directors as Martin Scorsese, Wim Wenders, Clint Eastwood and Francis Ford Coppola. Some of those early films include Raging Bull, Hammett, Any which way you can, Firefox, The Outsiders, and Rumble Fish. David segued into producing as an associate producer on Eastwood’s Pale Rider in 1984.

Valdes has had several films nominated in various Oscar categories over the years. He was nominated himself for Best Picture for The Green Mile along with the film's director-producer-screenwriter Frank Darabont.

Valdes served as Executive Producer on the sequels to Avatar: The Way of Water and Avatar: Fire and Ash.

== Filmography ==
=== Producer ===
- Point Break (2015)
- Transcendence (2014)
- Beautiful Creatures (2013)
- The Magic of Belle Isle (2012)
- The Book of Eli (2010)
- The Assassination of Jesse James by the Coward Robert Ford (2007)
- Open Range (2003)
- The Time Machine (2002)
- The Green Mile (1999)
- Turbulence (1997)
- The Stars Fell on Henrietta (1995)
- A Perfect World (1993)
- The Rookie (1990)
- Pink Cadillac (1989)
- The Dead Pool (1988)
- Like Father Like Son (1987)

=== Executive Producer ===
- Avatar: Fire and Ash (2025)
- Avatar: The Way of Water (2022)
- Alita: Battle Angel (2019)
- I Am Number Four (2011)
- Babylon A.D. (2008)
- In the Line of Fire (1993)
- Unforgiven (1992)
- White Hunter Black Heart (1990)
- Bird (1988)

=== Co-Executive Producer ===
- Gardens of Stone (1987)

=== Associate Producer ===
- Ratboy (1986)
- Pale Rider (1985)
