= NS 7600 =

Netherlands 0-6-0T locomotives

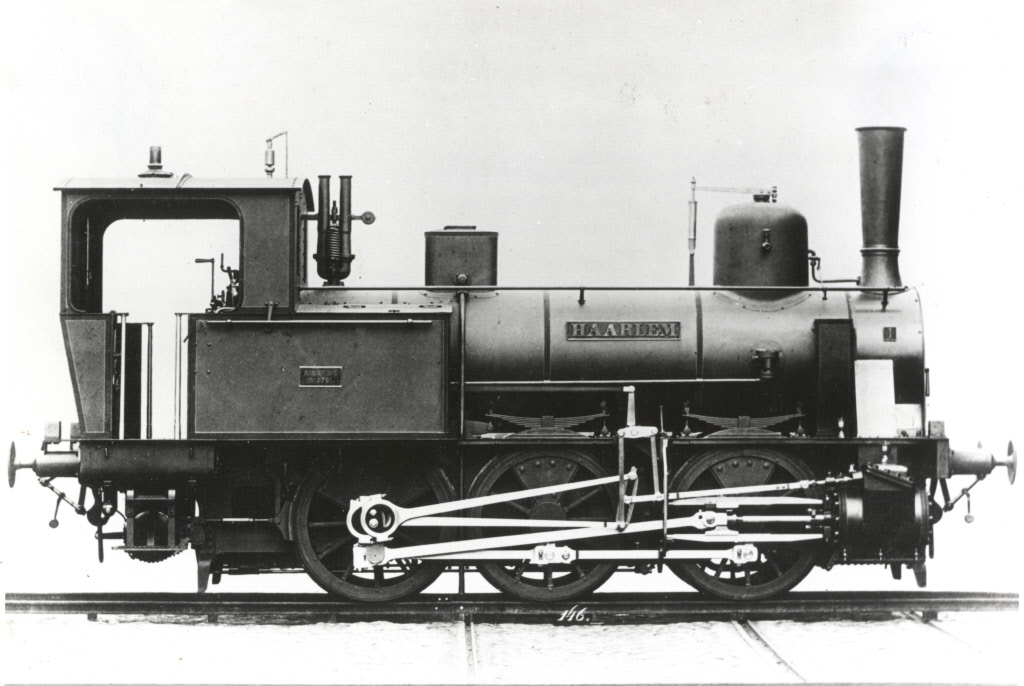
Type and origin
- Power type: Steam
- Builder: Borsig
- Build date: 1881 - 1882
- Total produced: 4
Specifications
- Configuration
  - Whyte: 0-6-0
  - UIC: C
- Gauge: 1,435 mm (4 ft 8 1/2 in)
- Driver dia.: 1,230 mm (4 ft 0 in)
- Length: 7,858 mm (25 ft 9.4 in)
- Height: 3,705 mm (12 ft 1.9 in)
- Loco weight: 27.8 t (30.6 short tons; 27.4 long tons)
- Fuel type: Coal
- Fuel capacity: 1 t (1.1 short tons; 0.98 long tons)
- Water cap.: 3.8 m^{3} (840 imp gal)
- Firebox
  - Grate area: 0.94 m^{2} (10.1 sq ft)
- Boiler pressure: 10.1 bar (146 psi)
- Heating surface
  - Firebox: 4 m^{2} (43 sq ft)
  - Tubes: 52.5 m^{2} (565 sq ft)
- Cylinders: 2
- Cylinder size: 300 mm × 500 mm (12 in × 20 in)
- Valve gear: Allan
Performance figures
- Maximum speed: 50 km/h (31 mph)
- Tractive effort: 25.99 kN (5,840 lbf)
Career
- Operators: NS, HSM, ZHSM
- Power class: HSM/NS: L^{2}
- Numbers: HZSM: 1-4; HSM: 296-299, later: 1001-1004; NS: 7601-7603
- Nicknames: Haarlem-Zandvoorters
- Withdrawn: 1918 - 1927
- Disposition: All scrapped

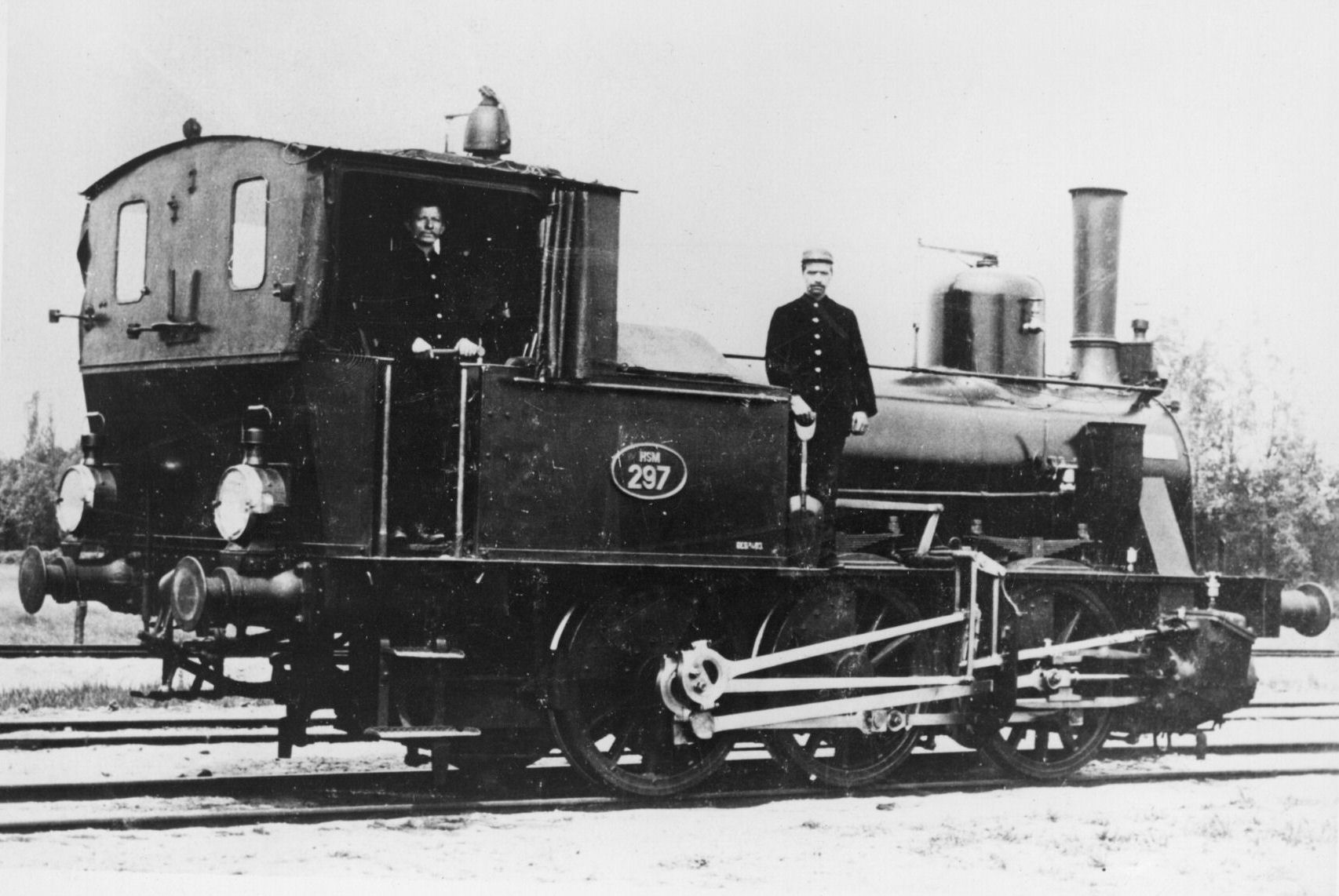
HSM 297 later NS 7602 with the driver and fireman (Between 1903 - 1905)

The NS 7600 was a series of tank engines of the Dutch Railways (NS) and its predecessor Hollandsche IJzeren Spoorweg-Maatschappij (HSM) and Haarlem-Zandvoort Spoorweg Maatschappij (HZSM).

For operations of the railway line between Haarlem and Zandvoort, which opened in 1881, the HZSM ordered three locomotives from Borsig, with a fourth locomotive following shortly after that, the locomotives delivered in 1881 and 1882. In addition to the numbers 1–4, the locomotives carried the names Haarlem, Overveen, Zandvoort and Rudolph Sulzbach. After the operation of this railway was transferred to the HSM on June 1 1889, the locomotives remained the property of the HZSM. However, the locomotives were provided with the HSM numbers 296-299 and the names were removed.

In 1903, the locomotives were sold to the Ahaus-Enscheder Eisenbahn Gesellschaft, but remained in service with the HSM. Between 1904 and 1906 the HSM renumbered the locomotives in 1001–1004. No. 1004 was seriously damaged in an accident in 1917, after which the locomotive was scrapped. Nos. 1001-1003 were handed over to the HSM at the end of 1918. When the fleets of the HSM and the SS was merged in 1921, the three remaining locomotives of this series were given the NS numbers 7601–7603. No. 7602 was withdrawn in 1926, followed in 1927 by Nos. 7601 and 7603. No locomotives have survived into preservation.

Lot No.	Name	Date built	HZSM nummer	First HSM number	Second HSM number	NS number	Withdrawn	Notes
3761	Haarlem	1881	1	296	1001	7601	1927	
3762	Overveen	1881	2	297	1002	7602	1926	
3763	Zandvoort	1881	3	298	1003	7603	1927	
3849	Rudolph Sulzbach	1882	4	299	1004	-	1917	Scrapped after accident

== Sources and references ==
- J. van der Meer: De Hollandsche IJzeren Spoorweg-Maatschappij. Uitg. Uquilair, 2009, ISBN 978-90-71513-68-8.
- J.J. Karskens: De Locomotieven van de Hollandsche IJzeren Spoorweg Maatschappij. Uitg. J.H. Gottmer, Haarlem - Antwerpen, 1947.
- Het Utrechts Archief.
