= Sandiford =

Sandiford is a surname. Notable people with the surname include:

- Benedict Sandiford, British actor
- Greg Sandiford (born 2000), Grenadian footballer
- Jacinta Sandiford (1932–1987), Ecuadorian high jumper
- Keith A. Sandiford (born 1947), a Barbadian writer living in the United States
- Keith A. P. Sandiford (born 1936), a Barbadian writer living in Canada
- Lindsay Sandiford, British woman convicted in 2013 of drug smuggling in Indonesia
- Lloyd Erskine Sandiford (born 1937), Barbadian politician
- Robert Edison Sandiford (born 1968), Canadian writer

== See also ==
- Sandford (disambiguation)
- Sandyford (disambiguation)
- Standiford (disambiguation)
