= Richard H. Hanson =

American politician (1931–2023)

Richard Harold Hanson (November 28, 1931 – January 2, 2023) was an American politician who served in the Minnesota House of Representatives from 1967 to 1969.

Hanson was born in Duluth, Minnesota, and graduated from Central High School in Duluth in 1949. He worked in the office machine business and with the railroad. Hanson served in the Minnesota National Guard from 1950 to 1957.

Hanson served in the Minnesota House of Representatives in 1967 and 1968, within the conservative caucus. After his term ended, he continued his career in business, running an office machine company and later owning two car dealerships. He retired in 1996.

Hanson was a Lutheran. He and his wife Jean (née Johnson) were married from 1953 until her death in 2020, and had five children. In his later years, Hanson lived in the Duluth suburb of Hermantown, Minnesota. He died at a care facility on January 2, 2023, at the age of 91.
