= Sandford (surname) =

Family name

Origin
- Language: Old English
- Meaning: sandy ford
- Region of origin: England, Scotland

Other names
- Variant forms: Sanford, St Fort

Sandford is an English language toponymic surname, deriving from numerous localities named for a sandy ford.

St Fort in Fife, originally Sandforde or Sandford, is a Scottish origin of the name.

Notable people with the surname include:

- Alexander Wallace Sandford Australian businessman and politician
- Ben Sandford (born 1979), New Zealand skeleton racer
- Chris Sandford (born 1939), English actor and writer on fly-fishing
- Christopher Sandford (1902–1983), Anglo-Irish private press owner, father of Jeremy
- Christopher Sandford (biographer) (born 1956), English journalist and biographer
- Daniel Fox Sandford (1831–1906), Bishop of Tasmania
- Daniel Sandford (journalist), British journalist
- Daniel Sandford (bishop of Edinburgh), (1766–1830), Bishop of Edinburgh
- Daniel Sandford (soldier), (1882–1972), British brigadier and advisor to Haile Selassie I of Ethiopia
- Ed Sandford (1928-2023), Canadian ice hockey player
- Elliott Sandford (1840–1897), American jurist from Utah
- Francis Sandford, 1st Baron Sandford (1824–1893), British civil servant
- Frank Sandford (1862–1948), founder of "The Kingdom", a Christian cult
- Frankie Sandford (born 1989), British singer: S Club 8, The Saturdays
- Gladys Sandford (1891–1971), New Zealand pilot
- James T. Sandford, American politician
- Sir James Wallace Sandford (1879–1958), Australian businessman and politician, son of Alexander
- Jeremy Sandford (1930–2003), English television writer, musician and visionary
- John de Sandford (died 1294), archbishop of Dublin
- John Sandford (novelist) (born 1944), American journalist and novelist
- Kenneth Sandford (1924–2004), English singer and actor
- Lettice Sandford (1902–1993), draftsman, wood-engraver, and watercolourist, mother of Jeremy
- Richard Sandford (died 1918), English recipient of the Victoria Cross
- Robert Sandford (explorer), English explorer of Carolina coast
- Teddy Sandford (1910–1995), English footballer
- Thomas Sandford (1762–1808), American soldier and politician
- Tiny Sandford (1894–1961), actor

== See also ==
- Khalifa St. Fort
- Sandford (disambiguation)
- Sanford (surname)
