= Like Father Like Son (1987 film) =

1987 film by Rod Daniel

- Theatrical release poster
- Directed by: Rod Daniel
- Written by: Steve Bloom; Lorne Cameron; David Hoselton
- Produced by: Brian Grazer; David Valdes
- Starring: Dudley Moore; Kirk Cameron; Margaret Colin; Catherine Hicks; Sean Astin
- Cinematography: James Crabe; Jack N. Green
- Edited by: Lois Freeman-Fox
- Music by: Miles Goodman; Shelly Manne
- Production company: Imagine Entertainment
- Distributed by: Tri-Star Pictures
- Release date: October 2, 1987
- Running time: 100 minutes
- Country: United States
- Language: English
- Budget: $10.5 million
- Box office: $34.4 million

Like Father Like Son is a 1987 American fantasy comedy film directed by Rod Daniel and starring Dudley Moore and Kirk Cameron about a father and son who magically switch bodies. The film was released by Tri-Star Pictures on October 2, 1987, and received mostly negative reviews from critics while grossing $34.4 million against a $10.5 million budget.

== Plot ==
Chris Hammond is a high school senior. He likes a girl at school, Lori, who is dating his rival and bully Rick. His father, Jack, is a surgeon who is trying to get promoted to chief of staff at his hospital. Chris has a friend, Clarence "Trigger", whose Uncle Earl had his leg fixed by Native Americans with a body-switching potion called the "Brain-Transference Serum". Trigger shows Chris how the serum works by trying it out on Chris' cat and dog, and the pets switch bodies. Trigger brought the serum in a Tabasco sauce bottle, and the Hammond's housekeeper Phyllis puts the bottle in the food cupboard. Jack unwittingly puts some serum in his Bloody Mary. The serum works by someone ingesting it, then the next person that looks into their eyes switches bodies with them. As Jack looks into his son's eyes, the father and son switch bodies.

Trigger states that he will get in contact with his Uncle Earl to find a way for the two to switch back, but Earl has just left for another trip. Chris goes to town in his dad's body, using his dad's credit card to shop and party with Trigger. He bumps into his dad's boss's wife while out in a bar but does not realize who she is. She comes on to him, and he accepts. In the morning, Jack in his son's body and Chris in his father's body wake up screaming and realize they are not dreaming. Jack goes to school in Chris's place, while Chris calls in sick at the hospital. Jack's boss Larry goes to Jack's house to check on him and sees him feeling better. Jack gets called in to work, and he ends up handing out a bunch of pills to patients while doing rounds. He also seconds a motion proposed by his dad's colleague, suggesting that the hospital could treat patients with no insurance.

Meanwhile, at school, Jack’s knowledge of the schoolwork and his willingness to point out troublemakers in class has him shunned by his fellow students. He takes Lori to a concert but does not enjoy himself, finding the music too loud. Then he fails to perform at the big relay race, and Rick beats him up because of the track meet and taking Lori out.

They finally get in touch with Earl, who explains that they can get the antidote if they go on a trip to Death Valley. After a few hiccups, they find the key ingredient for the antidote. Earl makes it up and they drink it; however looking into each other's eyes does not work. Earl explains it can sometimes take a while to work. The antidote finally works as Jack in Chris' body is running late for a meeting. Chris in Jack's body is on his way to a meeting about his dad becoming Chief of Staff, which will not happen now that Jack's boss found out what Chris did with his wife while in Jack's body. Now back in their own bodies, both of them race to the hospital.

Chris speaks up at the Chief of Staff meeting to try to persuade the boss to give his dad the job, but his boss will not hear it. Jack walks in and says he does not want the job anymore; he would rather spend the overtime with his son. On the way out, Trigger sees Rick and gives him the Brain-Transference Serum. The next person who looks into Rick’s eyes is Jack's employer, Dr. Larry Armbruster. The film end as they both scream after they switch bodies.

== Cast ==
- Dudley Moore as Jack Hammond
- Kirk Cameron as Chris Hammond
- Margaret Colin as Ginnie Armbruster
- Catherine Hicks as Dr. Amy Larkin
- Patrick O'Neal as Dr. Larry Armbruster
- Sean Astin as Clarence / Trigger
- Camille Cooper as Lori Beaumont
- Micah Grant as Rick Anderson
- Bill Morrison as Uncle Earl
- Skeeter Vaughan as Medicine Man
- Larry Sellers as Navajo Helper
- Tami David as Navajo Girl
- Graeme MacDonald as Navajo Boy
- Maxine Stuart as Phyllis, Hammonds' Housekeeper
- David Wohl as Dr. Roger Hartwood
- Michael Horton as Dr. Mike O'Donald
- Bonnie Bedelia (uncredited) as Lady with Gum in Hair

== Production ==
The project was first announced in January 1987 when it was reported that producers Brian Grazer and David Valdes were interested in casting Kirk Cameron to star opposite Dudley Moore in the film due to the success and popularity of Growing Pains. Cameron was unaware of the producer's interest in him for the project and didn't even need to audition and was offered the project outright and accepted as he liked the script and felt it had a good underlying message unlike some of the other scripts he'd been offered. Filming took place during hiatus between the second and third seasons of Growing Pains from March through May of that year in San Diego and Los Angeles, California. The script went through numerous re-writes prior to production wrapping with even Cameron himself admitting he wasn't sure what the movie was about.

== Reception ==
The film received negative reviews, particularly by famed movie critics Gene Siskel and Roger Ebert. Ebert called it "one of the most desperately bad comedies I've ever seen", but Siskel showed even more aggressive derision and hatred towards the film, calling it a "cheap marketing decision masquerading as a comedy". Metacritic, which uses a weighted average, assigned the film a score of 45 out of 100, based on 9 critics, indicating "mixed or average" reviews.

Motion picture-historian Leonard Maltin also wrote a negative review, declaring the film a "BOMB" and adding that "Dudley Moore's mugging talents get a major workout in this hall-of-fame embarrassment."

Conversely, Caryn James of The New York Times wrote that "Dudley Moore and Kirk Cameron are so clever and charming as the mismatched pair that they turn a potential dud into a sweetly engaging film", though she added that "it never fulfills its potential for being a shrewd satire of cross-generational manners". Despite the negative reviews, Cameron won the Saturn Award for Best Young Actor.

=== Box office ===
The film debuted at No. 2 behind Fatal Attraction.

== Soundtrack ==
- Autograph - "Dance All Night"
- Autograph - "She Never Looked That Good for Me"
- Marc Jordan - "I Ching"
- The Fabulous Thunderbirds - "It Comes to Me Naturally"
- Omar & the Howlers - "Hard Times in the Land of Plenty"
- Wang Chung - "Everybody Have Fun Tonight"
- Aerosmith - "Dude (Looks Like a Lady)"
- Ramones - "Somebody Put Something in My Drink"
- Mötley Crüe - "All in the Name of..."
- Mötley Crüe - "Wild Side"

== Home media ==
Like Father Like Son was released on VHS in 1988 and re-released in 1991. The DVD was released by Columbia TriStar Home Entertainment in 2004. The Double Feature 2-DVD Set with the film and Vice Versa by Columbia Pictures was released on October 7, 2008 by Sony Pictures Home Entertainment.
