= Terry Kunze =

American basketball player

Personal information
- Born: March 11, 1943 (age 83) Duluth, Minnesota, U.S.
- Listed height: 6 ft 4 in (1.93 m)
- Listed weight: 210 lb (95 kg)

Career information
- High school: Central (Duluth, Minnesota)
- College: Minnesota (1962–1965)
- NBA draft: 1965: 7th round, 58th overall pick
- Drafted by: St. Louis Hawks
- Playing career: 1966–1974
- Position: Shooting guard
- Number: 33
- Coaching career: 1974–1981

Career history

Playing
- 1967–1968: Minnesota Muskies

Coaching
- 1974–1977: Minnesota (assistant)
- 1978–1979: East Carolina (assistant)
- 1979–1981: Minnesota Fillies
- 1991–1992: Anoka-Ramsey CC
- Stats at Basketball Reference

Career coaching record
- WBL: 29–37 (.439)

Terry Duane Kunze (born March 11, 1943) is an American basketball player and coach. Kunze played in the 1967 season with the American Basketball Association's Minnesota Muskies after playing collegiately for the Minnesota Golden Gophers. Kunze attended Duluth Central High School in Duluth, Minnesota.

Kunze was drafted by the St. Louis Hawks, but instead chose to pursue a career in Belgium.

== Coaching career ==
In June 1978, Kunze was named the associate head coach of the East Carolina Pirates men's basketball team.

From 1979 to 1981, he was the head coach of the Minnesota Fillies of the Women's Professional Basketball League, the first women's pro basketball league in the United States.

In 1991, Kunze began coaching at Anoka-Ramsey Community College.
