= The Green Mile (film) =

1999 film by Frank Darabont

- Theatrical release poster
- Directed by: Frank Darabont
- Screenplay by: Frank Darabont
- Based on: The Green Mile by Stephen King
- Produced by: Frank Darabont; David Valdes
- Starring: Tom Hanks; David Morse; Bonnie Hunt; Michael Clarke Duncan; James Cromwell; Michael Jeter; Graham Greene; Doug Hutchison; Sam Rockwell; Barry Pepper; Jeffrey DeMunn; Patricia Clarkson; Harry Dean Stanton
- Cinematography: David Tattersall
- Edited by: Richard Francis-Bruce
- Music by: Thomas Newman
- Production companies: Castle Rock Entertainment; Darkwoods Productions
- Distributed by: Warner Bros. (Note: Universal Pictures International (formerly PolyGram Filmed Entertainment) distributed The Green Mile in eleven international territories under a deal PolyGram had made with Castle Rock. Elsewhere, Warner Bros., which also distributed in the United States and Canada, distributed excluding territories where it did not directly operate; Universal sold distribution rights in such territories to independent distributors.)
- Release date: December 10, 1999 (United States)
- Running time: 189 minutes
- Country: United States
- Language: English
- Budget: $60 million
- Box office: $286.8 million

The Green Mile is a 1999 American epic fantasy drama film written and directed by Frank Darabont and based on the 1996 novel by Stephen King. It stars Tom Hanks as a death row correctional officer during the Great Depression who witnesses supernatural events following the arrival of an enigmatic convict (Michael Clarke Duncan) at his facility.

The Green Mile was released by Warner Bros. in the United States on December 10, 1999, to positive reviews from critics, who praised Darabont's direction and writing, emotional weight, and performances (particularly for Hanks and Duncan), although its length received some criticism. It was a commercial success, grossing $286.8 million from its $60 million budget, and was nominated for four Academy Awards: Best Picture, Best Supporting Actor for Duncan, Best Sound, and Best Adapted Screenplay.

== Plot ==
In 1935, corrections officer Paul Edgecomb oversees "The Green Mile", the death row section of Cold Mountain Penitentiary, alongside officers Brutus Howell, Dean Stanton, Harry Terwilliger, and the sadistic and despised Percy Wetmore, whose connections to the state governor shield him from repercussions. The guards supervise three prisoners: Eduard "Del" Delacroix, whom Percy frequently torments; the violent and erratic William "Wild Bill" Wharton; and John Coffey, a hulking yet gentle and simple-minded African-American man convicted of raping and murdering two white girls after being found distraught while cradling their bodies. John asserts that he tried to "take it back", but could not.

Paul grows doubtful that John committed the crimes and soon discovers he possesses miraculous healing abilities. John cures his crippling bladder infection by absorbing it into himself before expelling it as flies, explaining that he "took it back". After Percy crushes Del's pet mouse, Mr. Jingles, John urgently requests the body and resurrects it, further convincing the guards of his powers.

Frustrated by Percy's behavior, the officers let him officiate an execution on the condition that he take a job at Briar Ridge Mental Hospital, afterward. At Del's execution, Percy deliberately neglects to wet the sponge meant to conduct electricity, sentencing Del to an agonizing death. John senses and is overwhelmed by Del's pain, inadvertently transferring some of his power to Mr. Jingles, who scurries away.

Paul convinces the guards (excluding Percy) to take John out of prison to heal Warden Hal's terminally ill wife, Melinda. They confine Percy to a padded cell as punishment for torturing Del before sneaking John to the warden's home. John absorbs Melinda's illness, but experiences severe pain from containing it within himself. The guards return John to his cell and release Percy, but John grabs Percy and forces flies into his mouth. In a possessed state, Percy shoots Wharton dead before the flies leave his body. Paul demands answers, and John shows him Wharton's memories, revealing he was responsible for the crimes of which John was convicted – John was attempting to resurrect the girls. Percy is left catatonic and later committed to Briar Ridge.

Though convinced of John's innocence, Paul cannot prove it or stop the execution. He offers John a chance to escape, believing it unacceptable to destroy what he considers to be a true miracle. John, however, exhausted by the constant pain he endures from sensing the suffering and ugliness that people inflict on each other, chooses to die. His last request is to watch a movie, never having seen one before, so he, Paul, and the other officers watch Top Hat (1935).

When John is taken to be executed, he tells the guards of his recent dream, in which he and the two girls are safe and happy. John is saddened by the hatred he feels from those in attendance, who still believe him to be guilty, but Brutus encourages him to focus on the guards, who do not hate him. John requests not to wear a hood because he is afraid of the dark. Paul briefly takes John's hand before the tearful officers reluctantly carry out the execution.

In 1999, Paul, now 108 years old, watches Top Hat and, upon being reminded of the events, recounts John's story to his friend Elaine, revealing that it was the last execution he and Brutus performed before transferring to juvenile corrections. Elaine is stunned when Paul reveals that Mr. Jingles is still alive. She calls Paul's longevity a miracle, but, having outlived all his loved ones, he instead sees it as divine punishment for allowing John to die. Some time later, after Elaine dies, Paul wonders how much longer he will live if a mouse's life could be so significantly extended, lamenting, "Sometimes, the Green Mile seems so long."

== Cast ==
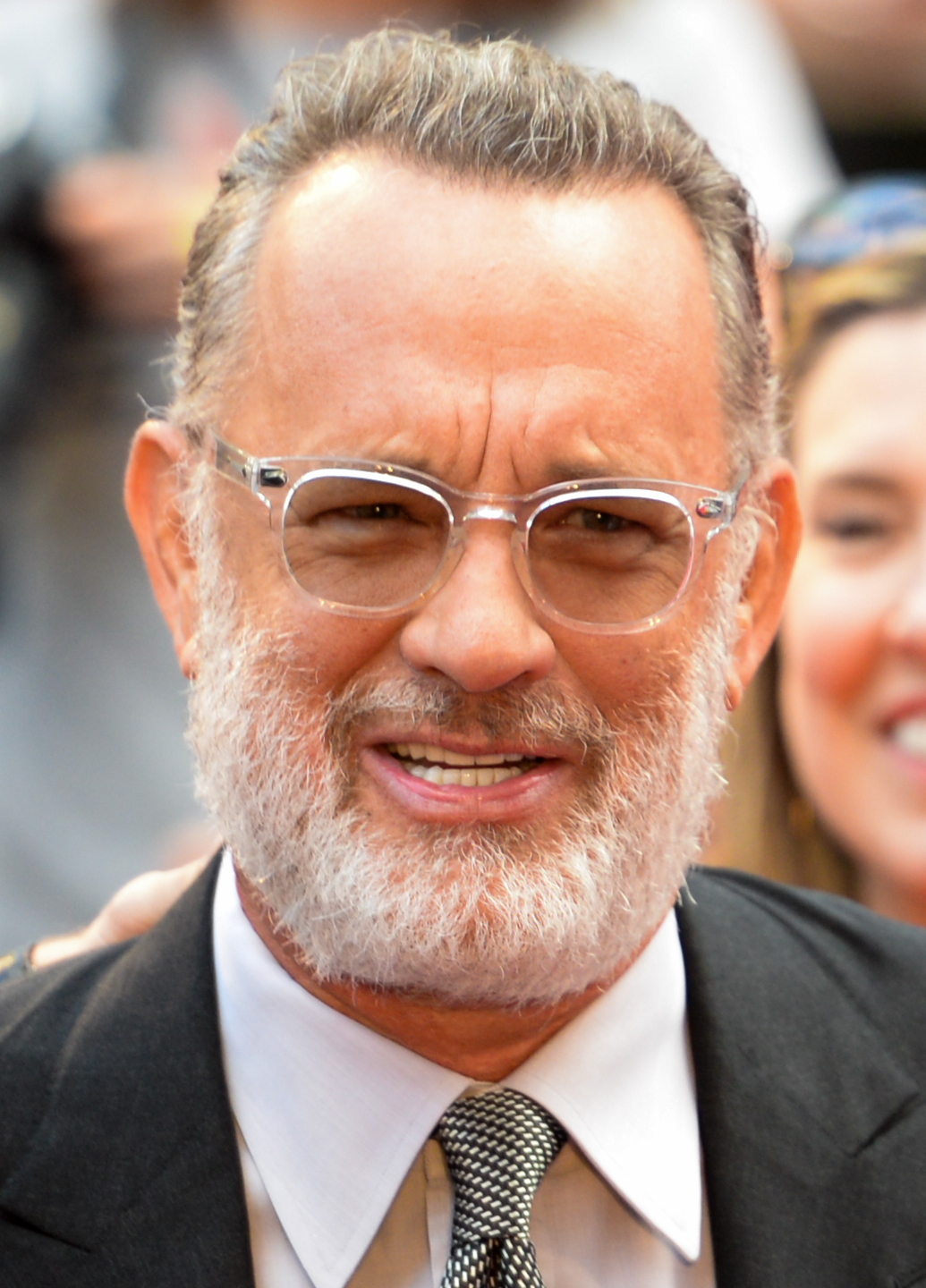
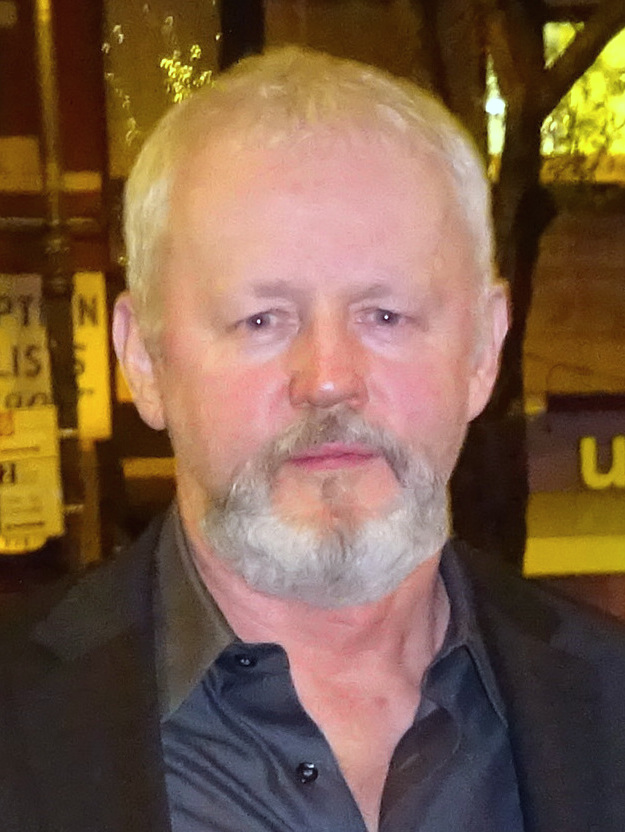
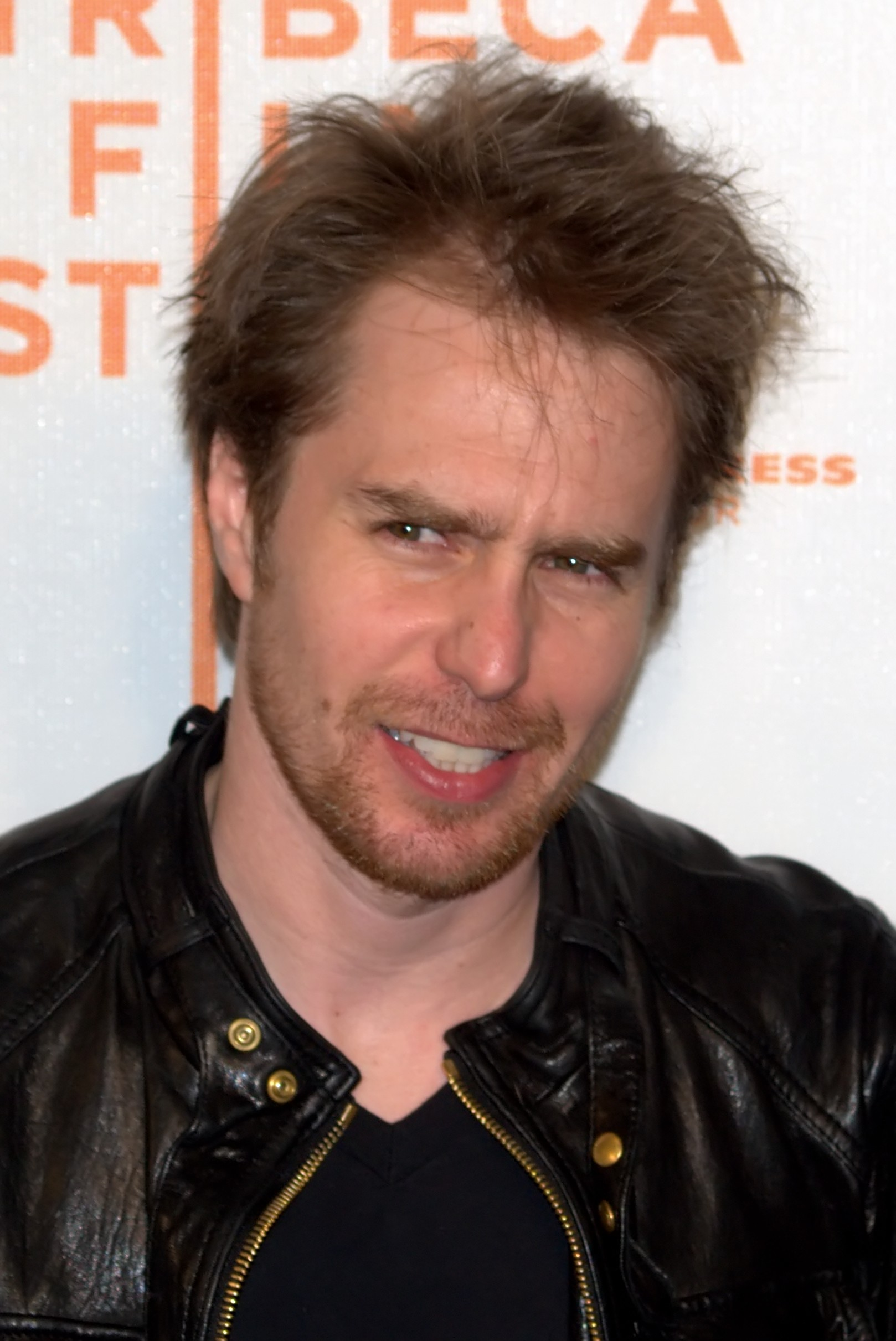
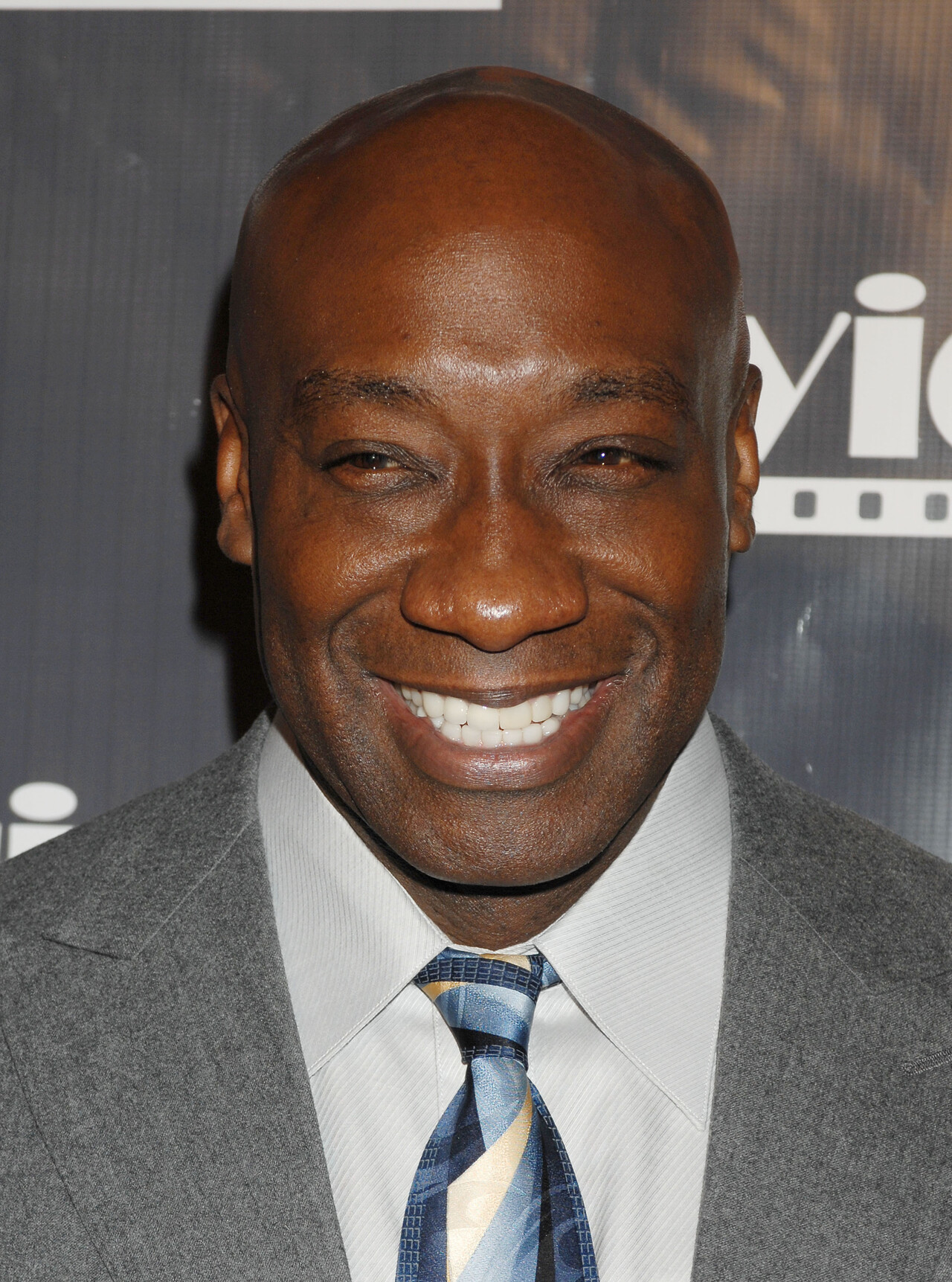
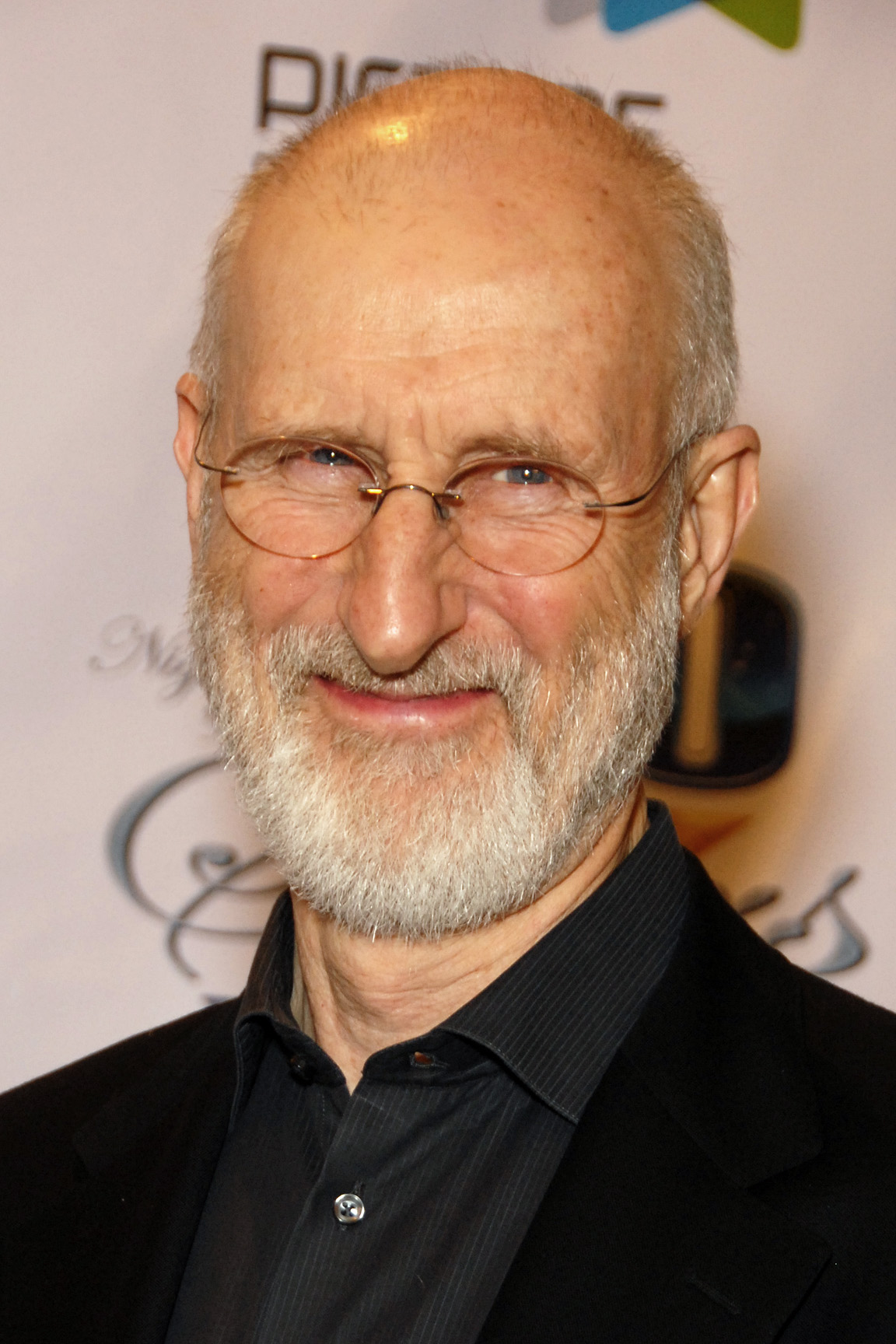
(Left to right) Tom Hanks (pictured in 2019), David Morse (2015), Sam Rockwell (2009), Michael Clarke Duncan (2009) and James Cromwell (2010)
- Tom Hanks as Paul Edgecomb
  - Dabbs Greer as old Paul Edgecomb
- David Morse as Brutus "Brutal" Howell
- Bonnie Hunt as Jan Edgecomb
- Michael Clarke Duncan as John Coffey
- James Cromwell as Hal Moores
- Michael Jeter as Eduard "Del" Delacroix
- Graham Greene as Arlen Bitterbuck
- Doug Hutchison as Percy Wetmore
- Sam Rockwell as William "Wild Bill" Wharton
- Barry Pepper as Dean Stanton
- Jeffrey DeMunn as Harry Terwilliger
- Bill McKinney as Jack Van Hay
- Patricia Clarkson as Melinda Moores
- Harry Dean Stanton as Toot-Toot
- Eve Brent as Elaine Connelly
- William Sadler as Klaus Detterick
- Paula Malcomson as Marjorie Detterick
- Brent Briscoe as Bill Dodge
- Gary Sinise as Burt Hammersmith

== Themes ==
Frank Darabont said that John Coffey "represents those extraordinary, visionary souls that come along in human history from time to time, that the rest of us feel compelled to exterminate. I've always found it extraordinary that we just can't seem to accept the message of peace and love. It's not such a crackpot notion. But whenever somebody comes along who embodies that notion, we have to nail him to a cross, we have to shoot him, we have to kill him."

Michael Clarke Duncan said, "John Coffey stands for everything that is right in the world. If you see an old lady crossing the street, and you go over to help her, to me, that's John Coffey. John Coffey stands for everything that is good about the earth."

James Cromwell said, "We continue, which is what John Coffey says, 'They kill each other with their love.' We continue to kill each other because we fail to recognize that all of us have the demon, and that the only way to deal with that demon is with love, and with compassion, and with understanding."

== Production ==
=== Development ===
Frank Darabont adapted Stephen King's novel, The Green Mile, into a screenplay in under eight weeks.

The film was shot at Warner Hollywood Studios, West Hollywood, California; and on location in Shelbyville, Tennessee; Blowing Rock, North Carolina; and the old Tennessee State Prison. The interior sets were custom built by production designer Terence Marsh. "We tried to give our set a sense of space. A sense of history. And a sense of mystery, in a way. We chose the elongated cathedral-like windows because there is a very mystical element in this movie, a supernatural element [...] It presented us with lots of opportunities", he said. The electric chair was also a bespoke design, and was inspired by real prisons that have the device.

The film title refers to the stretch of green floor in the hallway that the inmates walk down before they are to be executed by the electric chair.

=== Casting ===
John Travolta was offered the role of Paul Edgecomb, but turned it down; a decision he later regretted. Tom Hanks and Darabont met at an Academy Award luncheon in 1994. Stephen King stated he envisioned Hanks in the role and was happy when Darabont mentioned his name. Hanks was originally supposed to play elderly Paul Edgecomb as well, but the makeup tests did not make him look credible enough to be an elderly man. Because of this, Dabbs Greer was hired to play the older Edgecomb in his final film role.

Michael Clarke Duncan credited his casting to Bruce Willis, with whom he had worked on the film Armageddon one year earlier. According to Duncan, Willis introduced him to Darabont after hearing of the open call for John Coffey. Basketball player Shaquille O'Neal has stated he turned down the role of John Coffey. Josh Brolin was considered for the role of William "Wild Bill" Wharton.

David Morse had not heard about the script until he was offered the role. He stated he was in tears by the end of it. Darabont wanted James Cromwell from the start, and after he read the script, Cromwell was moved and agreed.

=== Music ===
The official film soundtrack, Music from the Motion Picture The Green Mile, was released on December 19, 1999, by Warner Sunset Records. It contains 37 tracks, primarily instrumental tracks from the film score composed and conducted by Thomas Newman. It also contains four vocal tracks: "Cheek to Cheek" by Fred Astaire, "I Can't Give You Anything but Love, Baby" by Billie Holiday, "Did You Ever See a Dream Walking?" by Gene Austin, and "Charmaine" by Guy Lombardo and His Royal Canadians.

== Release ==
In the United Kingdom, the film's distributors wished for The Green Mile to receive a 15 certificate from the British Board of Film Classification (BBFC), but they instead gave it an 18 rating, their strictest mainstream certificate, citing the film's "strong horror". After the distributors asked the BBFC to reconsider, the Board's presidential team viewed the film but again agreed that 18 was the appropriate certificate for the film; BBFC director Robin Duval said: "We can't give in. If we did, we would not be seen as independent. We would lose our credibility."

=== Box office ===
In the United States and Canada, The Green Mile opened on December 10, 1999, in 2,875 theaters and grossed $18 million in its opening weekend, placing second at the box office, just behind Toy Story 2 with $18.2 million, although Warner Bros. insisted that The Green Mile was the number one film. However, it did finish first for the week with $23.9 million compared to Toy Story 2's $22.1 million. It remained at number two in its second weekend and in the top 10 for 10 weeks but never reached number one for the weekend. It went on to gross $136.8 million in the United States and Canada and $150 million in other territories, bringing a worldwide total of $286.8 million, against its production budget of $60 million. It was the second highest-grosser in Japan for the year with a gross of $55.3 million.

== Reception ==
=== Critical response ===
On Rotten Tomatoes The Green Mile holds an approval rating of 78% based on 134 reviews with an average rating of 6.80/10. The website's critics consensus states, "Though The Green Mile is long, critics say it's an absorbing, emotionally powerful experience." At Metacritic the film has a weighted average score of 61 out of 100, based on 36 critics, indicating "generally favorable reviews". Audiences polled by CinemaScore gave the film an average grade of "A" on an A+ to F scale.

Film critic Roger Ebert gave the film three and a half out of four stars, writing, "The film is a shade over three hours long. I appreciated the extra time, which allows us to feel the passage of prison months and years ... it tells a story with beginning, middle, end, vivid characters, humor, outrage and emotional release". Writing for Entertainment Weekly, Lisa Schwarzbaum also took note of the film's length, but praised Tom Hanks' "superior" performance and Darabont's direction. "Darabont's style of picture making is well matched to King-size yarn spinning. The director isn't afraid to let big emotions and grand gestures linger", she said.

San Francisco Chronicle's Edward Guthmann thought the cinematography was "handsome", and the music was "florid and melodramatic". He added, "Darabont is such a committed filmmaker, and believes so earnestly and intensely in the stories he puts onscreen". Desson Thomson of The Washington Post called the storytelling "brilliant", and said "From its deceptively easygoing beginning to the heart-wrenching finale, The Green Mile keeps you wonderfully high above the cynical ground."

Some critics had a less positive response. Kirk Honeycutt of The Hollywood Reporter opined, "By inflating the simple story with a languorous pace, pregnant pauses, long reaction shots and an infinitely slow metabolism, Darabont has burdened his movie version with more self-importance than it can possibly sustain." While complimenting the production design and soundtrack, the critic from Timeout magazine thought some scenes were tiresome and the film "suffers from a surfeit of plot threads and characters".

Writing for the BBC, Clark Collis criticized the film's length and pacing. David Ansen of Newsweek thought The Green Mile was weaker than Darabont's previous film, The Shawshank Redemption (1994). He stated, The Green Mile is a "lumbering, self-important three-hour melodrama that defies credibility at every turn".

Stephen King praised the film adaptation, though he felt it was a little "soft" in some ways. He added, "I like to joke with Frank that his movie was really the first R-rated Hallmark Hall of Fame production. For a story that is set on death row, it has a really feel-good, praise-the-human condition sentiment to it. I certainly don't have a problem with that because I am a sentimentalist at heart."

The depiction of Coffey was considered among some in the African American community to be "somewhat of an embarrassment", even among those who enjoyed the film. Such viewers saw Coffey to be too complacent in being seen as "one more" black rapist and as having a shallow backstory.

=== Accolades ===
Award	Category	Recipients	Result	Ref.
Academy Awards	Best Picture	David Valdes and Frank Darabont	Nominated	
Academy Awards	Best Actor in a Supporting Role	Michael Clarke Duncan	Nominated	
Academy Awards	Best Adapted Screenplay	Frank Darabont	Nominated	
Academy Awards	Best Sound	Robert J. Litt, Elliot Tyson, Michael Herbick and Willie D. Burton	Nominated	
Black Reel Awards	Best Supporting Actor	Michael Clarke Duncan	Won	
Blockbuster Entertainment Awards	Favorite Actor – Drama	Tom Hanks	Won	
Blockbuster Entertainment Awards	Favorite Supporting Actor – Drama	Michael Clarke Duncan	Nominated	
Blockbuster Entertainment Awards	Favorite Supporting Actress – Drama	Bonnie Hunt	Nominated	
BMI Film & TV Awards	Film Music Award	Thomas Newman	Won	
Bram Stoker Awards	Best Screenplay	Frank Darabont	Nominated	
Broadcast Film Critics Association Awards	Best Film	The Green Mile	Nominated	
Broadcast Film Critics Association Awards	Best Screenplay, Adaptation	Frank Darabont	Won	
Broadcast Film Critics Association Awards	Best Supporting Actor	Michael Clarke Duncan	Won	
Chicago Film Critics Association	Best Supporting Actor	Michael Clarke Duncan	Nominated	
Chicago Film Critics Association	Most Promising Actor	Michael Clarke Duncan	Nominated	
Directors Guild of America Awards	Outstanding Directorial Achievement	Frank Darabont	Nominated	
Golden Globe Awards	Best Supporting Actor – Motion Picture	Michael Clarke Duncan	Nominated	
Golden Satellite Awards	Best Supporting Actor – Motion Picture	Doug Hutchison	Nominated	
NAACP Image Awards	Outstanding Supporting Actor in a Motion Picture	Michael Clarke Duncan	Nominated	
MTV Movie Awards	Best Breakthrough Male Performance	Michael Clarke Duncan	Nominated	
Motion Picture Sound Editors (Golden Reel Awards)	Best Sound Editing – Dialogue and ADR	Mark A. Mangini, Julia Evershade	Nominated	
Motion Picture Sound Editors (Golden Reel Awards)	Best Sound Editing – Effects and Foley	Mark A. Mangini, Aaron Glascock, Howell Gibbens, David E. Stone, Solange S. Schwalbe	Nominated	
People's Choice Awards	Favorite All-Around Motion Picture	The Green Mile	Won	
People's Choice Awards	Favorite Dramatic Motion Picture	The Green Mile	Won	
Saturn Awards	Best Action/Adventure/Thriller Film	The Green Mile	Won	
Saturn Awards	Best Director	Frank Darabont	Nominated	
Saturn Awards	Best Supporting Actor	Michael Clarke Duncan	Won	
Saturn Awards	Best Supporting Actress	Patricia Clarkson	Won	
Saturn Awards	Best Music	Thomas Newman	Nominated	
Science Fiction and Fantasy Writers of America (Nebula Award)	Best Script	Frank Darabont	Nominated	
Screen Actors Guild Awards	Outstanding Performance by a Male Actor in a Supporting Role	Michael Clarke Duncan	Nominated	
Screen Actors Guild Awards	Outstanding Performance by a Cast in a Motion Picture	The Green Mile	Nominated	

== Home media ==
The film was released on VHS and DVD on June 13, 2000, by Warner Home Video. The film earned $17.45 million in combined DVD and VHS rental revenue by June 18, 2000.

The Blu-ray was released on December 1, 2009. A remastered 4K UHD Blu-ray was released on February 22, 2022.
