= James Sandford =

James Sandford may refer to:

- James Sandford (translator), English author and translator
- James T. Sandford, American politician
- James Sandford (rugby union) (born 1989), Irish rugby player and James Sandford (TV personality), from Made in Chelsea
- James Wallace Sandford (1879–1958), businessman and politician in South Australia

== See also ==
- James Sanford (disambiguation)
