= Grijpskerke =

- Village
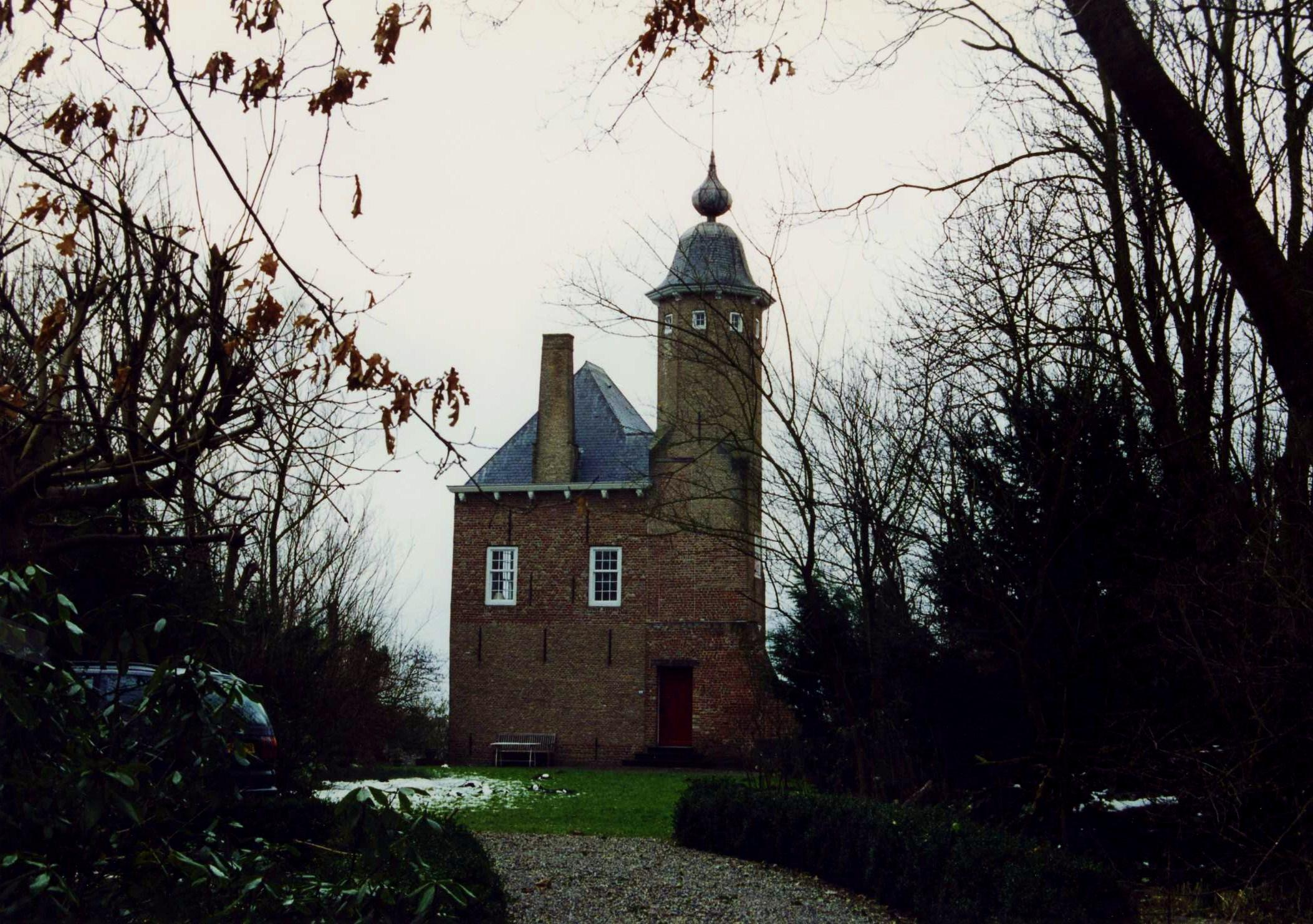
- Summer residence 't Munnikenhof

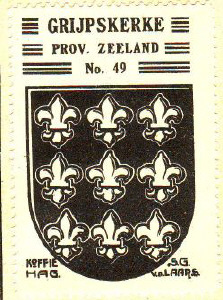
- Coat of arms

- Location in the province of Zeeland in the Netherlands Grijpskerke (Netherlands)
- Coordinates: 51°32′2″N 3°33′42″E
- Country: Netherlands
- Province: Zeeland
- Municipality: Veere

Area
  - Total: 16.82 km^{2} (6.49 sq mi)
- Elevation: 0.7 m (2.3 ft)

Population (2021)
  - Total: 1,420
  - Density: 84.4/km^{2} (219/sq mi)
- Time zone: UTC+1 (CET)
  - Summer (DST): UTC+2 (CEST)
- Postal code: 4364
- Dialing code: 0118

Grijpskerke is a village in the Dutch province of Zeeland. It is a part of the municipality of Veere and lies about 6 km northwest of Middelburg.

== History ==
The village was first mentioned between 1181 and 1210 as Gripeskirca, and means "(private) church of Gripe (person)". Grijpskerke is a circular church village. In 1344, a guest house was founded by the Middelburg Abbey.

The Dutch Reformed church is a double-aisled church with a wooden tower between the two roofs and contains 14th century elements. The church was enlarged in 1770 and the current tower was constructed.

The outpost of the abbey was converted in the summer residence 't Munnikenhof in the 17th century. It used to be owned by Jacob Cats. The main wing was demolished in 1860, and the remaining part was used as hunting lodge.

Grijpskerke was home to 408 people in 1840. It was a separate municipality until 1966. Before 1816 it was called "Grijpskerke en Poppendamme". That year it was merged with Hoogelande and Buttinge en Zandvoort. In 1997, it became part of the municipality of Veere.

== Gallery ==
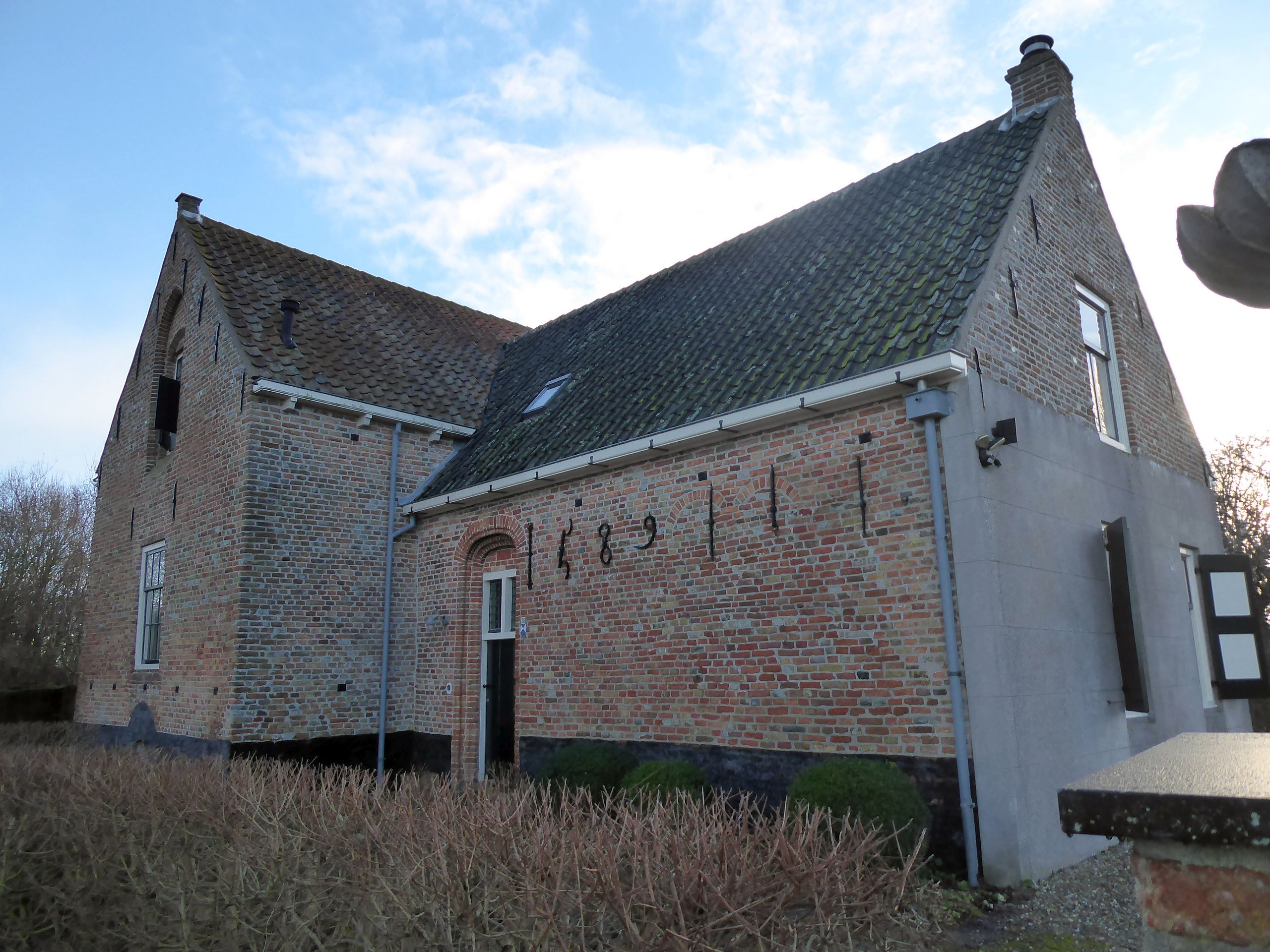
Farm Wilhelimina's Oord from 1489

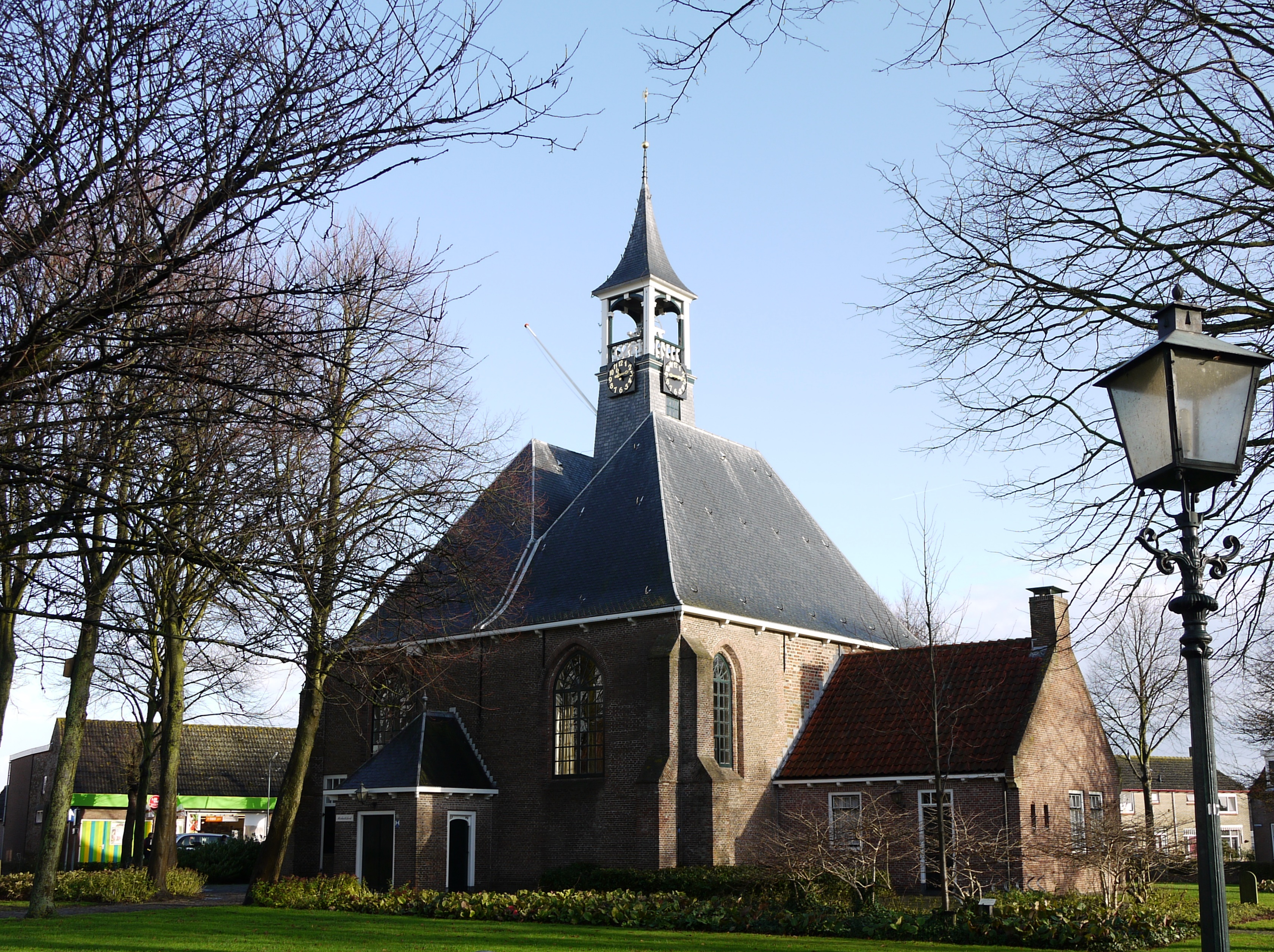
Dutch Reformed church

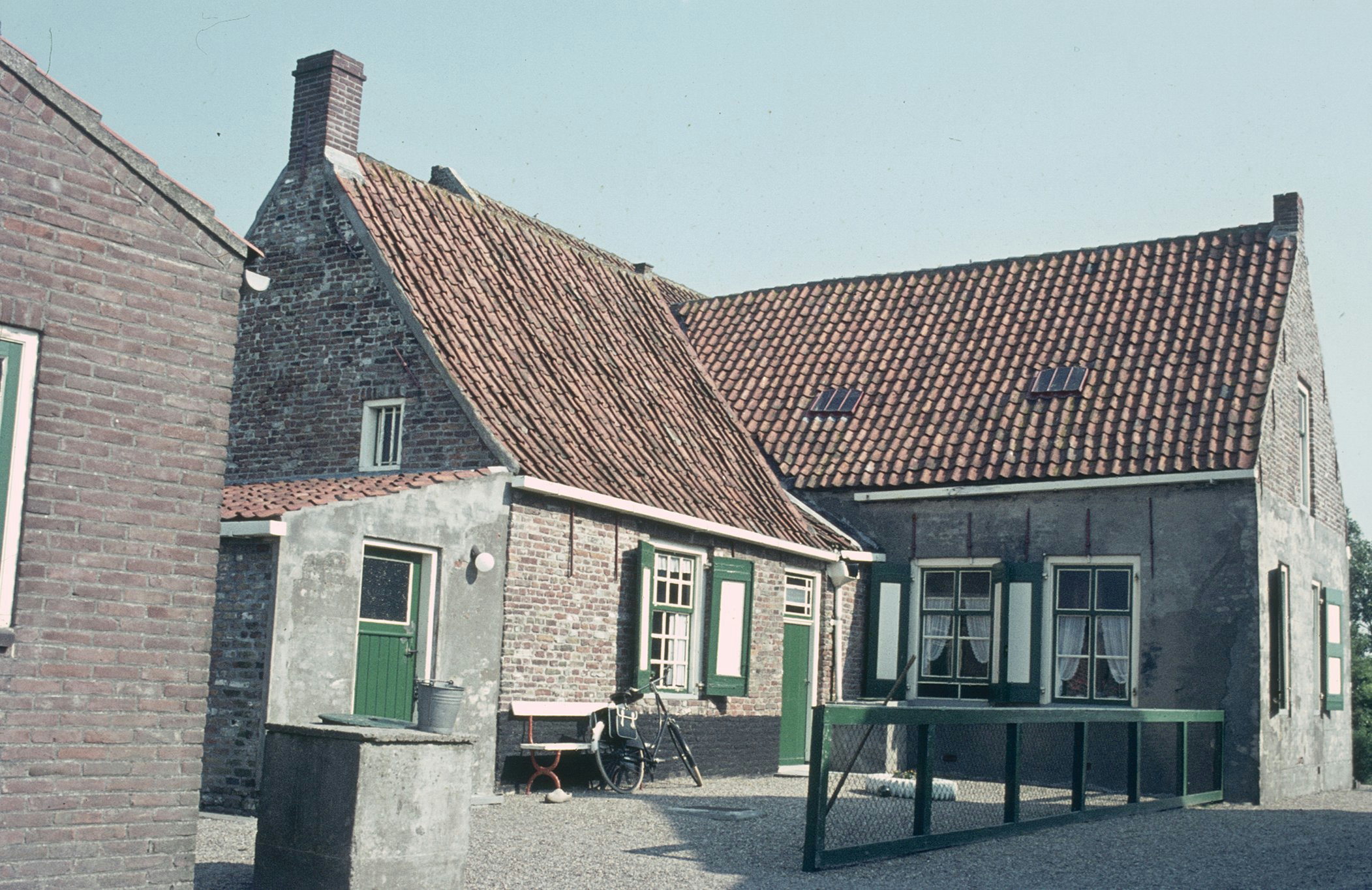
Farm in Grijpskerke

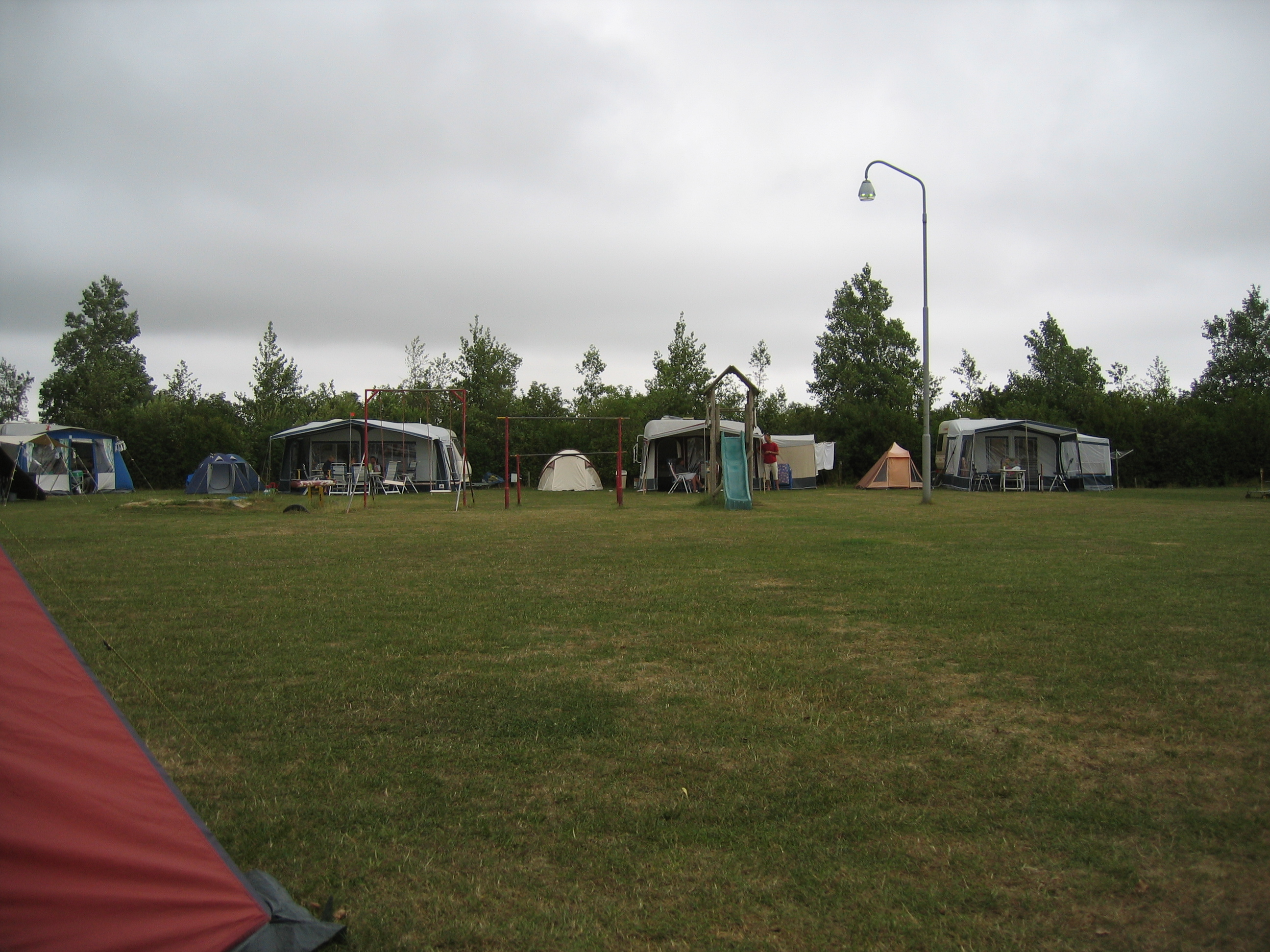
Mini Camping
