= Edward Sanford =

Edward Sanford may refer to:

- Edward Sanford (New York politician) (1805–1876), American lawyer, writer and politician from New York
- Edward Ayshford Sanford (1794–1871), British Member of Parliament
- Edward J. Sanford (1831–1902), American manufacturing tycoon and financier
- Edward Terry Sanford (1865–1930), American jurist
