= James Sanford =

James Sanford may refer to:

- James Sanford (sprinter) (born 1957), American track and field sprinter
- James Sanford (ice hockey) (born 1984), Canadian professional ice hockey defenceman
- James Terry Sanford (1917–1998), United States Senator from North Carolina

== See also ==
- James Sandford (disambiguation)
