= Zandvoorde =

Zandvoorde may refer to:

- Zandvoorde, Ostend, a Belgian village, part of the city of Ostend
- Zandvoorde, Zonnebeke, a Belgian village, part of the municipality of Zonnebeke

== See also ==
- Zandvoort, North Holland, Netherlands
- Sandford (disambiguation)
