= Hoogelande =

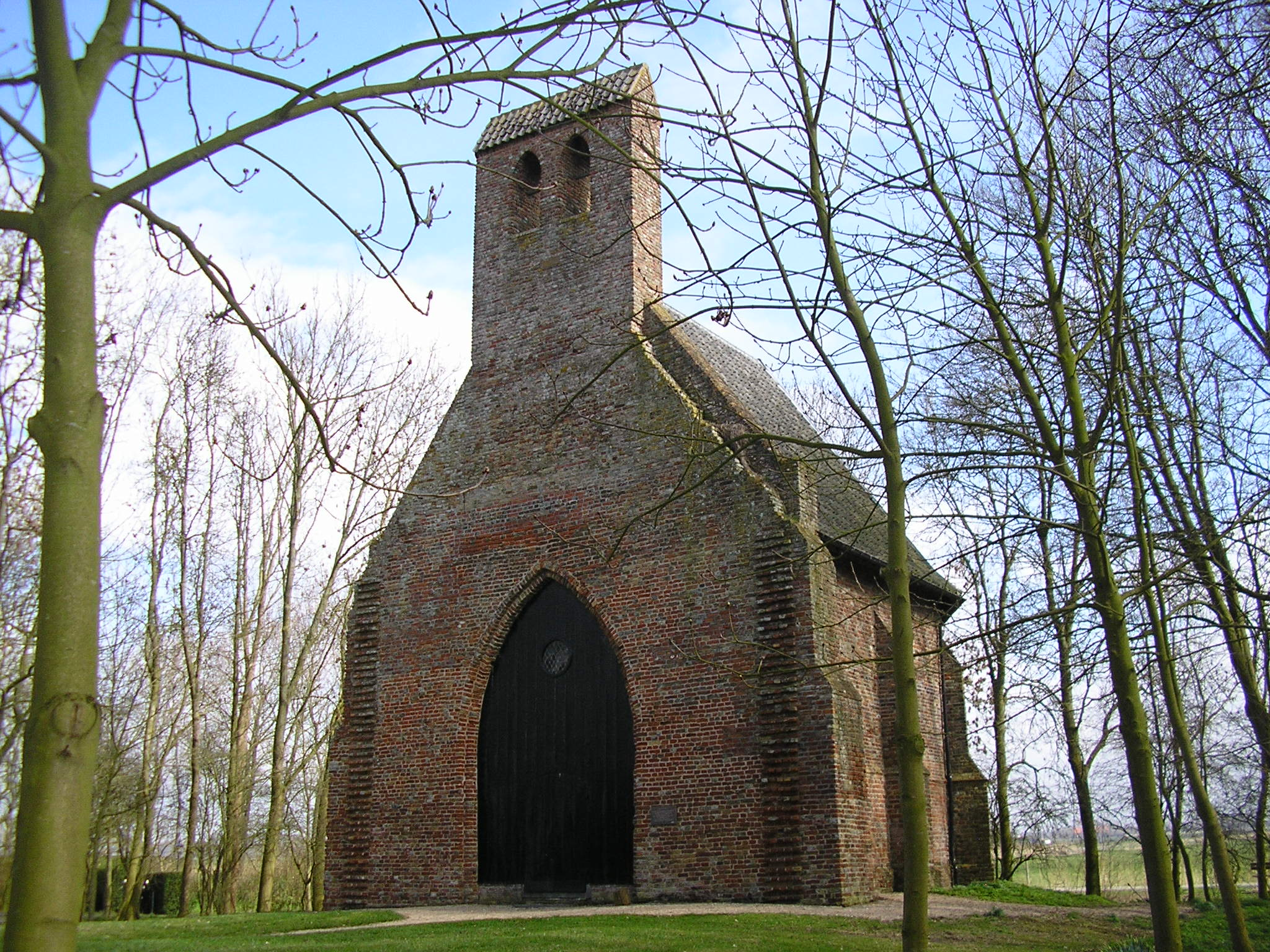
- Hoogelande chapel
- Interactive map of Hoogelande
- Coordinates: 51°30′24″N 3°33′39″E
- Country: Netherlands
- Province: Zeeland
- Municipality: Veere

Hoogelande is a small hamlet in the Dutch province of Zeeland. It is located in the municipality of Veere, about 4 km northwest of Middelburg.

Hoogelande was a separate municipality until 1816, when it was annexed by Grijpskerke.
