= 6 Stanford Street =

Listed building in Nottingham, England

Coordinates: 52°57′2.61″N 1°9′0.17″W

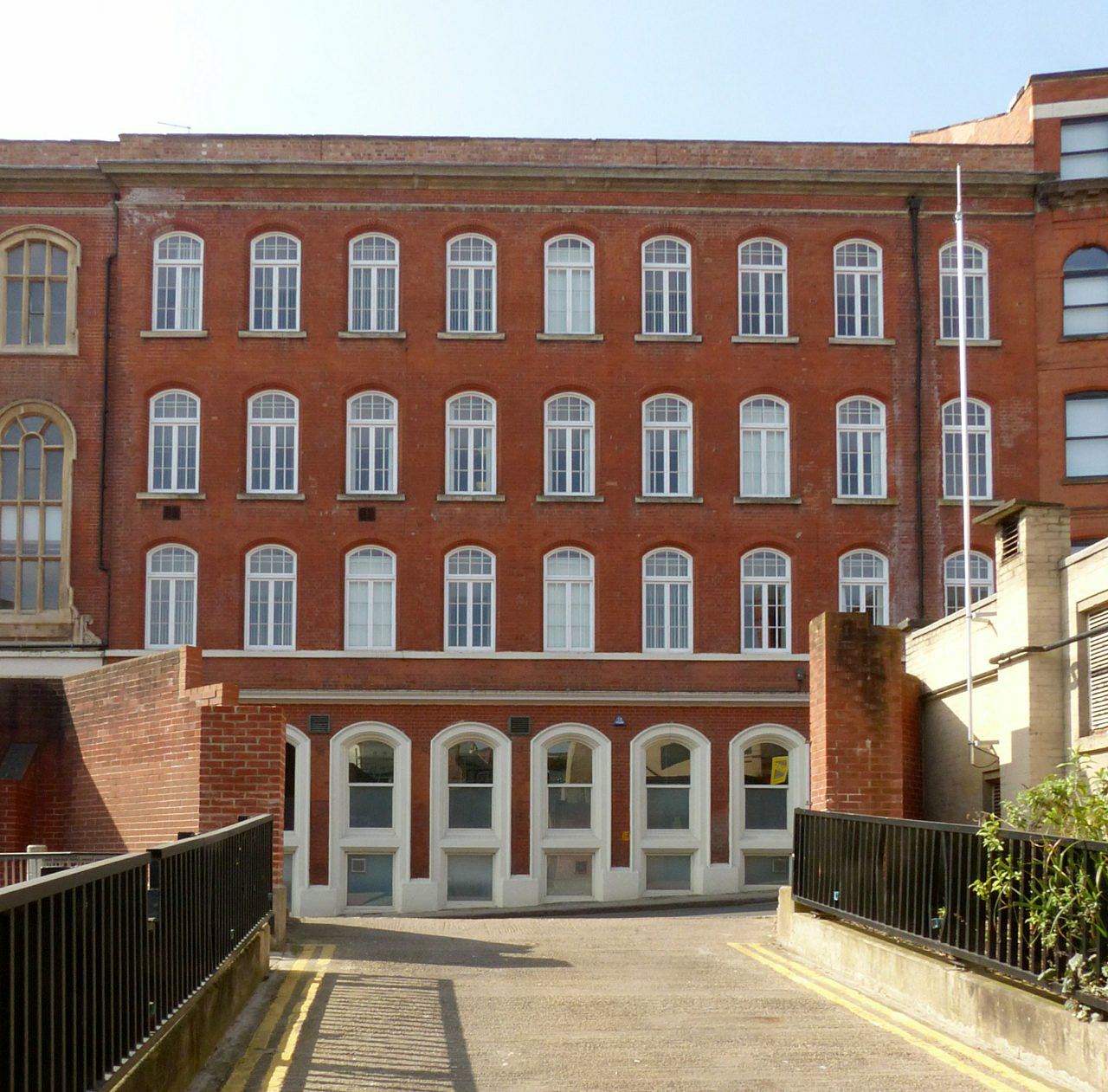
- Stanford House, 6 Stanford Street, Nottingham

- Location within Nottingham
- Alternative names: Stanford House

General information
- Location: Nottingham, England
- Completed: c. 1854
- Client: William Stanford

Listed Building – Grade II
- Official name: Stanford House
- Designated: 12 July 1972
- Reference no.: 1270422

6 Stanford Street, also known as Stanford House, is a 19th-century Grade II listed former warehouse on Stanford Street in Nottingham, England. It should not be confused with 19 Castle Gate, an 18th-century Grade II* listed house on the corner of Stanford Street and Castle Gate, which is also known as Stanford House.

The warehouse was built c. 1854 by TC Hine of Nottingham for J Lewis & Son. It was converted into offices in the late 20th century.
