= Standiford =

Standiford may refer to:

- Standiford Field, former name of Louisville International Airport
- Standiford, Louisville, defunct neighborhood in Kentucky, U.S.

== People with the surname Standiford ==
- Elisha Standiford (1831–1887), American politician
- Ethel Standiford-Mehling (1871–1963), American photographer
- Les Standiford, American author

== See also ==
- Sandiford (disambiguation)
