= Winifred Sanford =

American writer

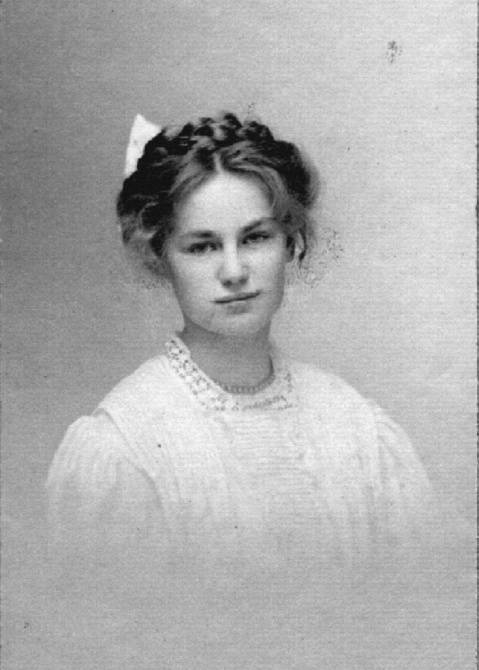
Winifred Sanford in 1908.

Winifred Balch Mahon Sanford (March 16, 1890 - March 24, 1983) was an American writer, best known for her short stories which often focused on the oil industry.

She was published in Woman's Home Companion, North American Review and The American Mercury during the 1920s and 1930s. Sanford's writing has been valued for its literary merit and also for her critical view of Texas culture changing and adapting to the oil industry.

== Biography ==
Sanford was born in Duluth, Minnesota, to an educated family. She attended Duluth Central High School, where she graduated in 1907. She attended Mount Holyoke College for only a year before she went on to the University of Michigan. Sanford received a major in English from the University of Michigan in 1913. She taught English for four years in Michigan and Idaho high schools.

Sanford and her future husband, Wayland Hall Sanford, attended the same high school and both went to the University of Michigan. They were married in 1917. Wayland Sanford went on to Texas to find work as a lawyer in the oil and gas industry.

Sanford's first daughter, Emerett, was born in Duluth on January 28, 1920 and she followed her husband to Texas when Emerett was eight months old, to the place he had settled in at Wichita Falls . Sanford's second daughter, Helen, was born in Texas on January 24, 1922. That year, Sanford also joined the Wichita Fall's literary group, called The Manuscript Club. Most of her short fiction was written while she was a member of this club.

In 1925, Sanford's first work, "Wreck," was published by H.L. Mencken in 1925. Mencken was an "unabashed fan of her fiction." He also called her "one of the coming writers of America." Mencken's friendship with Sanford took the form of "friendly correspondence" and went on until he resigned as an editor in the early 1930s. During these correspondences, Mencken encouraged her work and her writing. In 1926, Sanford was the only Texas writer to be included in The Best American Short Stories collection by Edward J. O'Brien. Four of her stories were included.

Rumors that Sanford was going to release a novel were written about in 1927 in the Wichita Daily Times. However, when she was unable to find a publisher, she "apparently burned the manuscript."

Sanford and her family moved to Dallas in 1931. She had a third daughter, Mary, in 1933. She helped found the Texas Institute of Letters as a charter member in 1936. For a year after 1937, she was bedridden because of having contracted tuberculosis. Sanford continued to write while she was in Dallas. She published a few articles, including an article on "Derrick Jargon." However, her daughter, Emerett, wrote that "new interests grew to fill her days, and she went on to other things." Sanford did get involved in the community, serving on different community boards, such as the Dallas YMCA and becoming involved with the First Unitarian Church.

Sanford's husband died in 1978. Sanford died in Dallas on March 24, 1983.

Sanford's short fiction was collected and published by SMU Press in 1988 in the collection, Windfall and Other Stories. A biography about her was written in 2013 called Winifred Sanford: The Life and Times of a Texas Writer, by Betty Holland Wiesepape. In her biography, Wiespape argues that Sanford's work "belongs to a broader tradition of American oil fiction writers such as Upton Sinclair." The 2013 biography also contains an appendix which includes two of her unpublished short stories.

A 1995 film written by her grandson, The Stars Fell on Henrietta, was based on Sanford's short story, "Luck."

== Writing ==
As a writer, Sanford stressed that it was important to use elements of style in a harmonious way and to remember that "you are writing for your reader and not to satisfy yourself." She also found that she received good support and feedback by being part of a writer's group in Wichita Falls, the Manuscript Club.

Sanford used the short story form partly because it worked well within the publishing model used by magazine in the early 1900s. In addition, her works were regionalist in nature and exposed the effects of the oil industry on women, small landowners and people of color. The regionalism seen in her work, while questioning modernity, did not question the "economic forces" shaping the change around them. Yet Sanford does not "idealize" the past, either. Wiesepape describes Sanford's style as an "unsympathetic" which allowed her as a writer to "maintain emotional distance from working-class characters who struggle to survive tragic events."

Sanford critiqued the need (or perceived need) for consumer goods in many of her stories, including "Windfall" and in "Mr. Carmichael's Room." She also looked at power structures which could change quickly during the oil boom. She also wrote "cutting and unsentimental" critiques of working conditions in the early industry, especially in her short story, "Luck." The story, about Oklahoma oil fields was considered "stark and staring" by the Coshocton Tribune. Mencken himself liked the realism and objectivity that appeared in her stories.

== Bibliography ==
A list of Winifred Sanford's publications, as taken from Betty Holland Wiesepape's biography on her, Winifred Sanford: The Life and Times of a Texas Writer (2013):

- "England and the Home-Rule Question" (October 1913) South Atlantic Quarterly
- "Wreck" (January 1925) The American Mercury
- "The Forest Fire" (April 1925) The American Mercury
- "Allie" (June 1925) The American Mercury
- "Saved" (January 1926) The American Mercury
- "The Monument" (January 1926) Woman’s Home Companion
- "The Method of Irony" (March 1926) The Editor
- "Mary" (May 1926) Woman’s Home Companion
- "The Blue Spruce" (May 1926) The American Mercury
- "Black Child" (January 1927) The American Mercury
- "Fools" (June 1928) Woman’s Home Companion
- "Windfall" (June 1928) The American Mercury
- "Luck" (September 1930) The American Mercury
- "Mr. Carmichael’s Room" (April 1931) The American Mercury
- "Fever in the South" (November 1931) North American Review
- "Two Junes" (November 1931) Household Magazine
- "Derrick Jargon" (April 1934) Southwest Review
- "Writing the Short Story" (October 1935) Southwester
- "Fannie Baker" (January 1988) Windfall and Other Stories
- "A Victorian Grandmother" (January 1988) Windfall and Other Stories
