= Governor Stanford =

Governor Stanford may refer to:

- Leland Stanford (1824–1893), Governor of California
  - Gov. Stanford, locomotive that was named for him
- Rawghlie Clement Stanford (1879–1963), Governor of Arizona
