= Elias B. Sanford =

American clergyman

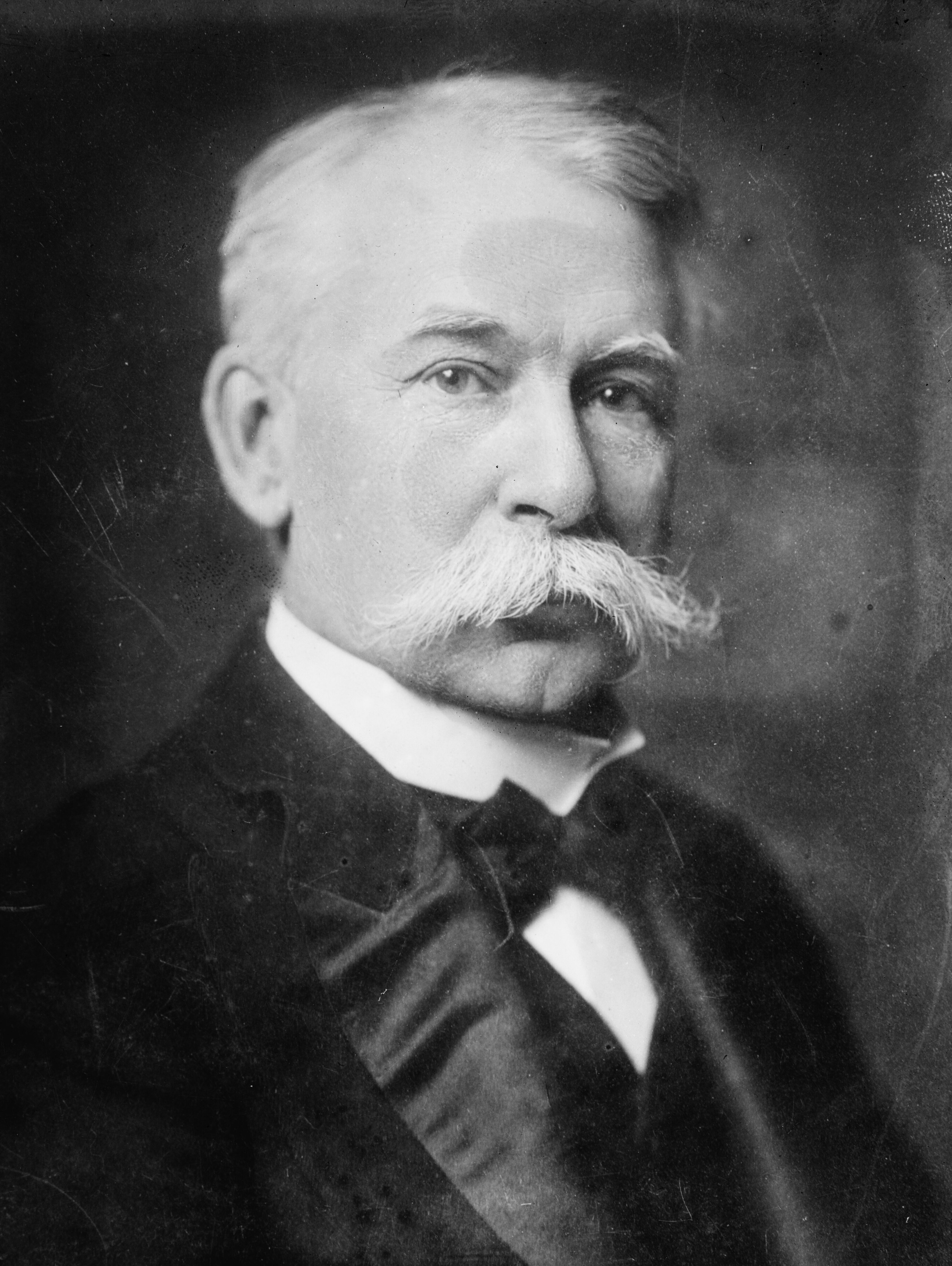
Rev. E.B. Sanford, D.D.

Elias Benjamin Sanford (1843-1932) was an American clergyman, notable for his role in helping create the Federal Council of Churches. A Methodist by training from his time at Wesleyan University, he spent the majority of his career preaching at Congregationalist churches in Connecticut.
