= Senator Stanford (disambiguation) =

Leland Stanford (1824–1893) was a U.S. Senator from California from 1885 to 1893. Senator Stanford may also refer to:

- Anthony Stanford (1830–1883), Arkansas State Senate
- Charles Stanford (politician) (1819–1885), New York State Senate
- Derek Stanford (politician) (born 1970), Washington State Senate
