= Stamford High School =

Stamford High School may refer to:

- Stamford High School (Stamford, Connecticut)
- Stamford High School (Texas)
- Stamford High School, Lincolnshire
