= Haarlem-Zandvoort Spoorweg Maatschappij =

Dutch local railway company

Overview
- Headquarters: Amsterdam
- Locale: The Netherlands
- Dates of operation: 1880–1889
- Successor: Hollandsche IJzeren Spoorweg-Maatschappij (HSM)

Technical
- Track gauge: 1,435 mm (4 ft 8 1/2 in)
Route map
Haarlem - Zandvoort

The Haarlem-Zandvoort Spoorweg Maatschappij (HZSM) was the first local railway company in the Netherlands, founded on November 29, 1880, in Amsterdam. This company built the Haarlem - Zandvoort railway, which was opened on June 3, 1881.

In Haarlem, the HZSM had its own Haarlem Bolwerk station, just in front of the junction where the railway lines from Zandvoort, Uitgeest and Rotterdam converge. From the opening in 1881 the trains continued to the HSM station Haarlem, with a few through trains to Amsterdam in the summers of 1882, 1883, 1887 and 1888. Haarlem Bolwerk station was closed in 1886 and demolished in 1905. On June 1, 1889, the HZSM was taken over by the HSM.

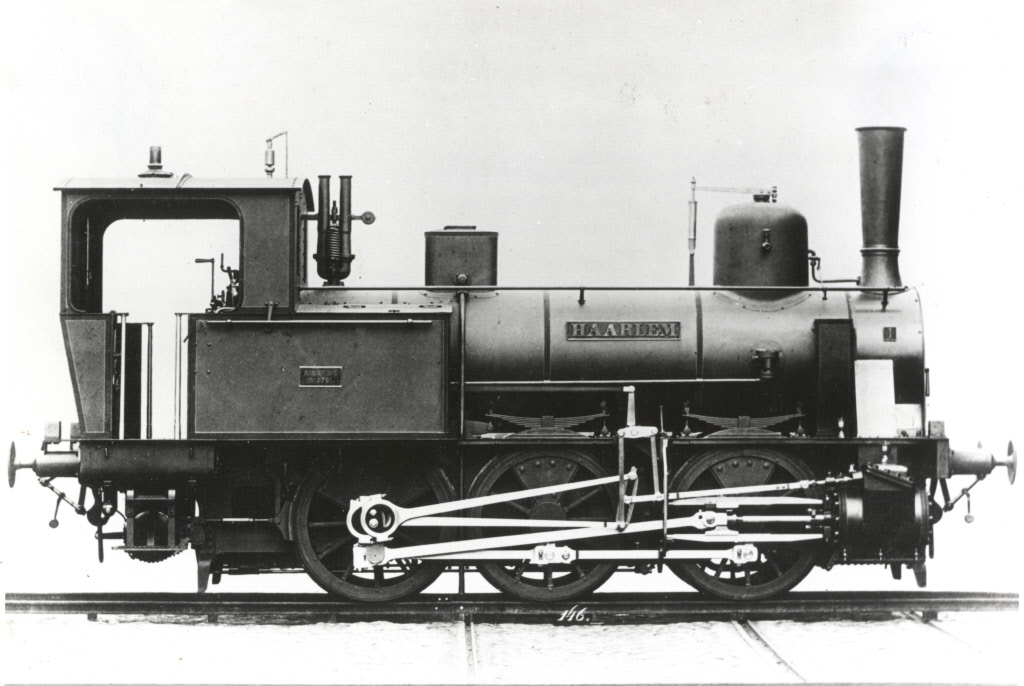
HZSM No.1 "Haarlem"

The HZSM had four locomotives of the NS 7600 series (Haarlem, Overveen, Zandvoort and Rudolph Sulzbach), 15 carriages and two vans. The locomotives were built in 1881 (the first three) and 1882 (the fourth) by Borsig in Berlin. The carriages were built by Maschinenbau-AG Nürnberg in Nuremberg and the goods vans by Van der Zypen & Charlier in Deutz. After the railway was taken over by the HSM in 1889, the locomotives and rollingstock remained in the ownership of the HZSM, who loaned them to the HSM. In 1898 the locomotives and rollingstock was transferred to the HSM, which sold the locomotives on to the Ahaus-Enscheder Eisenbahn Gesellschaft in 1903. The carriages have undergone various renovations at both the HZSM and the HSM, due to changed needs for the various classes and space for luggage in the trains.

== Sources ==
- Van Wijck Jurriaanse, N.J.: Lokaalspoor- en tramwegen van de Hollandsche IJzeren Spoorwegmaatschappij, uitgegeven door Uitgeverij Wyt 1878. ISBN 90-6007-577-3.
- Station Haarlem. Hollandsche sporen door Haarlem en omstreken. Uitgeverij Spaar en Hout, Haarlem, 2006. ISBN 978-90-8683-004-6
- Van der Meer, Jacq.: De Hollandsche IJzeren Spoorwegmaatschappij, uitgegeven door Uitgeverij Uquilair 2009. ISBN 90-71513-68-8.
