= Stamford Bridge =

Stamford Bridge may refer to:

- Stamford Bridge, East Riding of Yorkshire, a village in England
  - Battle of Stamford Bridge, 25 September 1066
- Stamford Bridge (bridge), a bridge in the village of Stamford Bridge
- Stamford Bridge (stadium), in London
- Stamford Bridge (Cedar Butte, South Dakota), United States, a bridge on the National Register of Historic Places
