= 19 Castle Gate =

Listed building in Nottingham, England

Coordinates: 52°57′4.32″N 1°9′0.14″W

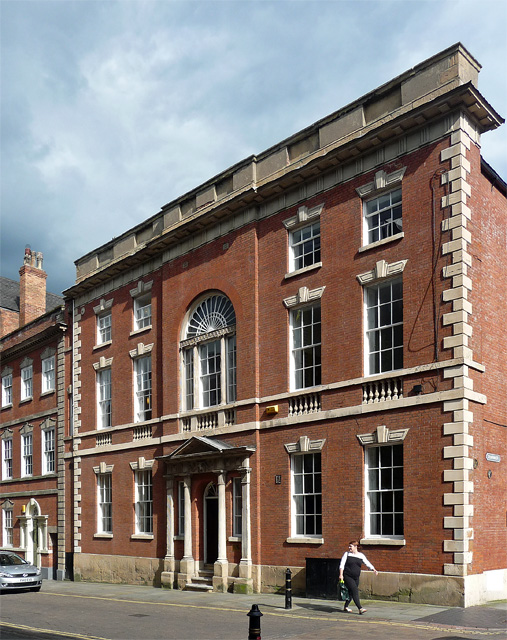
- Stanford House, 19 Castle Gate, Nottingham

- Location within Nottingham
- Alternative names: Stanford House

General information
- Location: Nottingham
- Completed: 1775
- Client: William Stanford

Listed Building – Grade II*
- Official name: 19, Castle Gate
- Designated: 11 August 1952
- Reference no.: 1246653

19 Castle Gate, also known as Stanford House, is an 18th-century Grade II* listed building on the corner of Castle Gate and Stanford Street, in Nottingham, England. It should not be confused with 6 Stanford Street, a 19th-century Grade II listed former warehouse, which is also known as Stanford House.

== History ==
The house was built for William Stanford, a merchant hosier, in 1775. The front facade contains a large fanlight above the main door framed with a bucrania frieze and fluted columns, with a venetian window above. The garden front contains a three-storey bay and may have formed part of the previous mansion on the site built by George Augustus, Viscount Howe of Langar Hall in 1755.

It was converted into offices in 1928 and was the offices of Robert Barber and Sons, solicitors. In 1990 it was put up for sale with an asking price of £500,000.

== See also ==
- Grade II* listed buildings in Nottinghamshire
- Listed buildings in Nottingham (Bridge ward)
