= Sandford =

Sandford may refer to:

== People ==
- Baron Sandford
- Baron Mount Sandford
- Sandford (surname)
- Sandford Fleming (1827-1915), Scottish-Canadian engineer and inventor of Standard Time

== Places ==
=== Australia ===
- Sandford, Tasmania
- Sandford, Victoria

=== Canada ===
- Sandford, Nova Scotia

=== England ===
- Dry Sandford, Oxfordshire
- Sandford, Cumbria, village in Westmorland and Furness district
- Sandford, Devon
- Sandford, Dorset
- Sandford, Hampshire
- Sandford, Isle of Wight
- Sandford-on-Thames, Oxfordshire
- Sandford Orcas
- Sandford St. Martin, Oxfordshire
- Sandford, Somerset
- Sandford, Whitchurch, near Whitchurch, location of Sandford Hall, home of the Sandford family
- Sandford, Gloucestershire, a fictional village in the film Hot Fuzz
- Sandford, a mockup village in Cheshire used for training police, part of Bruche Police National Training Centre
- Parsons Green and Sandford (ward), London

=== Ireland ===
- Sandford Park School, Dublin

=== Scotland ===
- Sandford, South Lanarkshire
- An older spelling of St Fort, Forgan, Fife
- An older spelling of St Ford, Kilconquhar, Fife

=== United States ===
- Sandford, Indiana

== See also ==
- Sandiford (disambiguation)
- Sandyford (disambiguation)
- Sanford (disambiguation)
- Zandvoort, North Holland, Netherlands
- Zandvoorde (disambiguation)
