= Samford =

Samford, as a person, may refer to:

- John A. Samford (1905-1968), a United States Air Force general
- William J. Samford (1844-1901), an American politician from Alabama

Samford, as a place, may refer to:

- Samford Hundred, Suffolk, a former administrative division in Suffolk, England
- Samford Rural District, Suffolk, a former administrative division in Suffolk, England
- Samford, Queensland, a town in South East Queensland, Australia
  - Samford Village, Queensland, a locality in South East Queensland, Australia
  - Samford Valley, Queensland, a locality in South East Queensland, Australia
- Samford University, a private university in Homewood, Alabama, United States
- Samford Stadium-Hitchcock Field at Plainsman Park, a college baseball venue for the Auburn University Tigers
- Duck Samford Stadium, a football and soccer venue for the Auburn High School Tigers
