= NS 7700 =

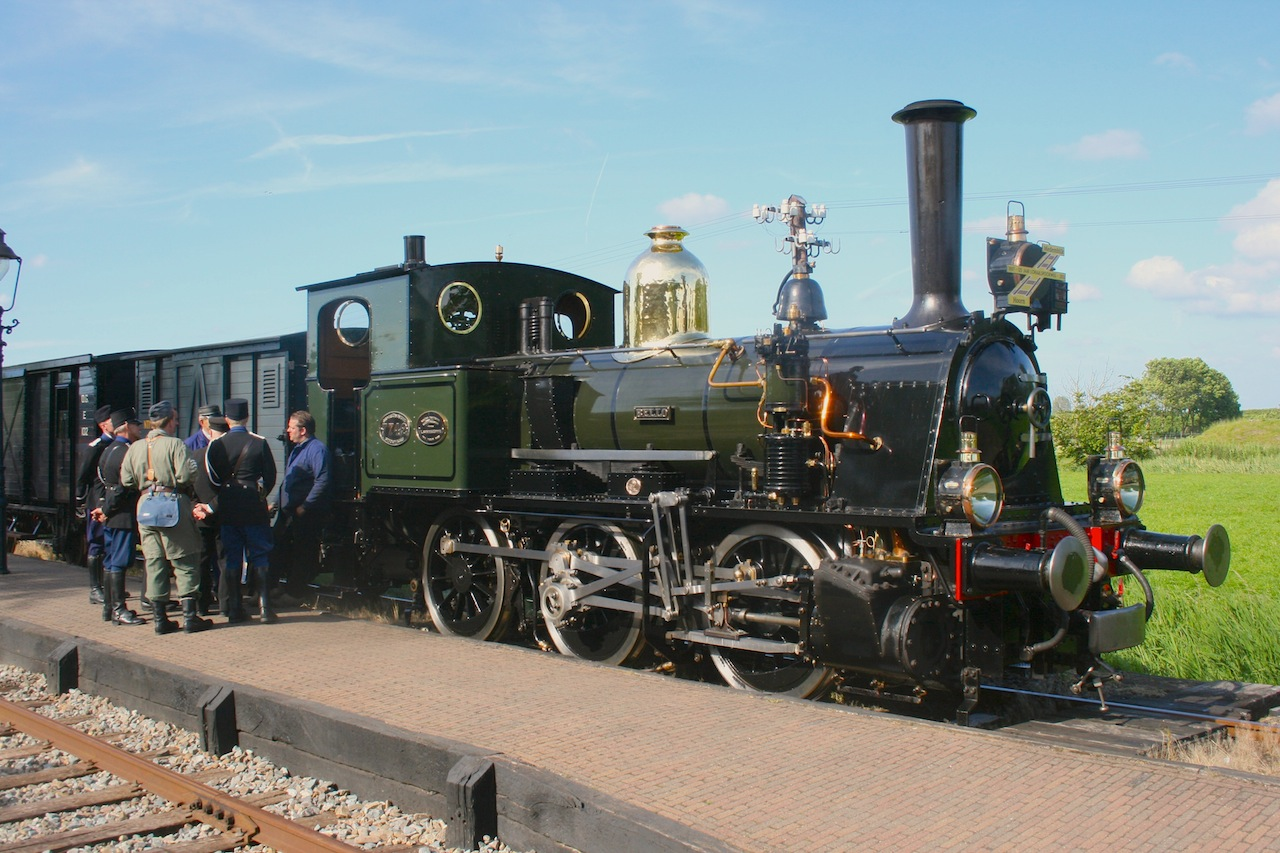
Type and origin
- Power type: Steam
- Builder: Werkspoor, Henschel & Sohn, Schwartzkopff
- Build date: 1905 - 1914
- Total produced: 44
Specifications
- Configuration
  - Whyte: 0-6-0T
  - UIC: C n2t
- Gauge: 1,435 mm (4 ft 8 1/2 in)
- Driver dia.: 1,232 mm (4 ft 0.5 in)
- Length: 8,310 mm (27 ft 3 in)
- Height: 3,976 mm (13 ft 0.5 in)
- Loco weight: 32.1 t (35.4 short tons; 31.6 long tons)
- Fuel type: Coal
- Fuel capacity: 1 t (1.1 short tons; 0.98 long tons)
- Water cap.: 3.8 m^{3} (840 imp gal)
- Firebox
  - Grate area: 1.25 m^{2} (13.5 sq ft)
- Boiler pressure: 12.4 kg/cm^{2} (176 psi)
- Heating surface
  - Firebox: 4.5 m^{2} (48 sq ft)
  - Tubes: 48.5 m^{2} (522 sq ft)
- Cylinders: 2
- Cylinder size: 330 mm × 550 mm (13 in × 22 in)
- Valve gear: Allan
Performance figures
- Maximum speed: 60 km/h (37 mph)
- Tractive effort: 4,220 kgf (9,300 lbf)
Career
- Operators: NS, HSM
- Power class: HSM: L2; NS: L3
- Numbers: HSM: 1005-1048; NS: 7701-7744
- Nicknames: Haarlemmermeertjes; Bello's
- Withdrawn: 1937 - 1955
- Disposition: One preserved, remainder scraped

The NS 7700 was a series of tank engines of the Dutch Railways (NS) and its predecessor the Hollandsche IJzeren Spoorweg-Maatschappij (HSM).

== History ==
To increase the speed on the local railway lines to 50 km/h, the HSM needed stronger tank engines than the existing ones with four driving wheels. Eight six wheeled locomotives, comparable to the four locomotives of the series 1001-1004 taken over from the Haarlem-Zandvoort Spoorweg Maatschappij, were ordered from Werkspoor. These entered service with the numbers 1005–1012 in 1905 and 1906. Two follow-up orders were soon placed with Werkspoor, which entered service in 1908 and 1909 as 1013-1018 and 1019–1022. In 1912, a follow-up series 1023-1034 built by Henschel was put into service, after which another series, delivered by Werkspoor, followed in 1913 as 1035–1043. Finally, in 1914, Schwartzkopff built the last successor series that entered service as 1044–1048.

When the locomotive and rolling stock fleet of the HSM and the SS was merged in 1921, the locomotives of this series were given the NS numbers 7701–7744. Because these were often used on the Haarlemmermeer railway lines, they were nicknamed 'Haarlemmermeertjes' by the staff. But the series was also used to replace the series 6700 on the GOLS lines in Overijssel. The 7700s were also used between Dieren – Apeldoorn and Apeldoorn – Zwolle. After the series 5000, 5300 and 7000 replaced them in 1928, the series 7700 was increasingly used for shunting or put into storage.

Since 1931–1933, Nos. 7737–7744, had couplings fitted for running with tram rolling stock, they were used on the tram line between Alkmaar and Bergen.

During World War II, when the diesel locomotives were withdrawn from service due to fuel shortages, the stored NS 7700 series returned to service. After the war, the series NS 7700 was withdrawn from service between 1945 and 1955.

== Royal Blast Furnaces ==
In 1941 the NS 7732 was sold to the Koninklijke Hoogovens, who put the locomotive into service with the number 27 after a thorough rebuild the locomotive ran between the station Beverwijk and the Blast Furnaces. Due to the lower loading gauge on the site of the Blast Furnaces, the chimney was shortened and the front of the smokebox was painted with scare stripes, as is usual with the Hoogovens. The locomotive was withdrawn from service in 1956 and subsequently scrapped.

== Bello ==
'Bello' is the nickname of steam locomotive NS 7742, which has been in service on various routes in the Netherlands since 1915. The locomotive is the only preserved local railway locomotive in the Netherlands, but it owes its fame mainly to the tram line Alkmaar – Bergen aan Zee.

Bello was delivered to the HIJSM by the Berlin factory Schwartzkopff in 1914 and ran as locomotive No. 1046 from 1915 on all kinds of local railway lines such as the so-called Haarlemmermeer lines, the lines Dieren – Apeldoorn and Apeldoorn – Zwolle and lines of the GOLS in the east of the Netherlands. The locations of the locomotive at that time included Apeldoorn, Winterswijk, Neede, Doetinchem, Uithoorn and Hattem. In 1921, HSM No. 1046 was renumbered NS No. 7742. On June 1, 1927, she was involved in a cyclone disaster. On this day she was in the shed for maintenance in Neede when the roof of the shed collapsed and ended up on the NS 7742. The locomotive was repaired in Wpc Haarlem. From 1932 she was used on the tram line Alkmaar – Bergen aan Zee. After August 31, 1955, the route was closed by the NS, the day after the NS 7742 had made its farewell run on the line.

Bello returned to Bergen in 1960 and was erected as a monument in the middle of the village. Standing still in all weathers proved to be detrimental to its lifespan, so in 1978 the locomotive was sold to the Museum Steam Tram Hoorn-Medemblik for the symbolic amount of one NLG. The restoration lasted until 1985. On April 3, 1985, the newly built separate boiler was tested. Many newspapers then reported, not entirely correctly, "Bello is under steam again". On August 4, the locomotive ran under its own power for the first time. On August 6, the locomotive made its first kilometers on the Hoorn – Medemblik line, in a return trip to Wognum, with an inspector from NS on board, who approved the locomotive for service. On August 9, the first day of the first 'Bello Festival', the locomotive was festively inaugurated with a run with invited guests. However, the SHM management continued to regard this as one of the test runs and the official run took place on June 26, 1986.

In practice, the SHM mainly uses the locomotive for the daily afternoon tram in the high season, with the Dutch wooden tram carriages. In July 2010, it was celebrated that the locomotive had traveled a total of 1,000,000 kilometers.

In May 2014, NS 7742 got a completely new chimney, this one was made in England, to replace the old original chimney. A new smokebox door has also been made, which is made according to the NS model. On Saturday 13 September, Bello returned to Bergen once more on the occasion of the Open Monument Day 2014 with the theme 'On a Journey'. The locomotive was transported to the village on a low-loader and was on display on the town square.

A few traces of the former tram line can still be found in Bergen. For example, there is still a Stationsstraat, and something of the route can still be recognized in the line Dreef – Plein – Berkenlaan – Rondelaan.

The name 'Bello' was never given to any locomotive of the series. The term became a nickname among the public for all small locomotives on local railways and tramways that regularly rang their bell loudly when passing a level crossing or on the side of a road. The line Alkmaar – Bergen aan Zee was one of the last lines they were used on. When locomotive NS 7742 became a monument in Bergen, the nickname was given to this locomotive.

In the miniature city of Madurodam there is a model of NS 7742.

=== Overview ===
Factory	Factory number	Date built	HSM numbers	NS numbers	Withdrawn	Notes
Werkspoor	143-144	1905	1005-1006	7701-7702	1947	
Werkspoor	145-150	1906	1007-1012	7703-7708	1945-1948, 1954	NS 7708 withdrawn in 1954.
Werkspoor	220-225	1908	1013-1018	7709-7714	1937-1949	
Werkspoor	234-237	1909	1019-1022	7715-7718	1938-1952	
Henschel	10790-10801	1912	1023-1034	7719-7730	1937-1954	
Werkspoor	313-321	1913	1035-1043	7731-7739	1941-1955	NS 7732 in service as Koninklijke Hoogovens No. 27 between 1941 and 1956.
Schwartzkopff	5247-5251	1914	1044-1048	7740-7744	1952-1955	NS 7742 preserved by SHM.

== Gallery ==
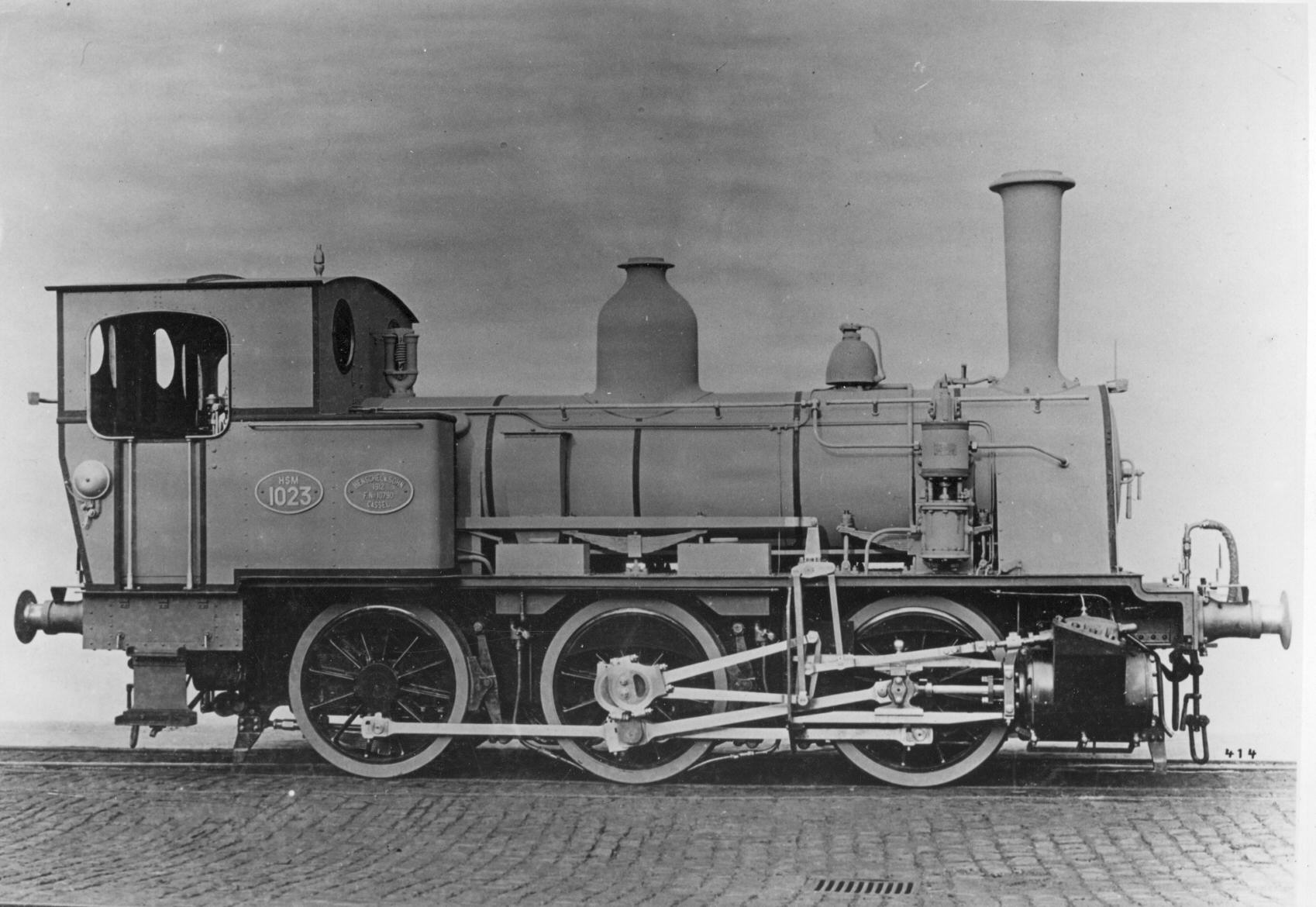
NS 7719 / HSM 1023 (1912)

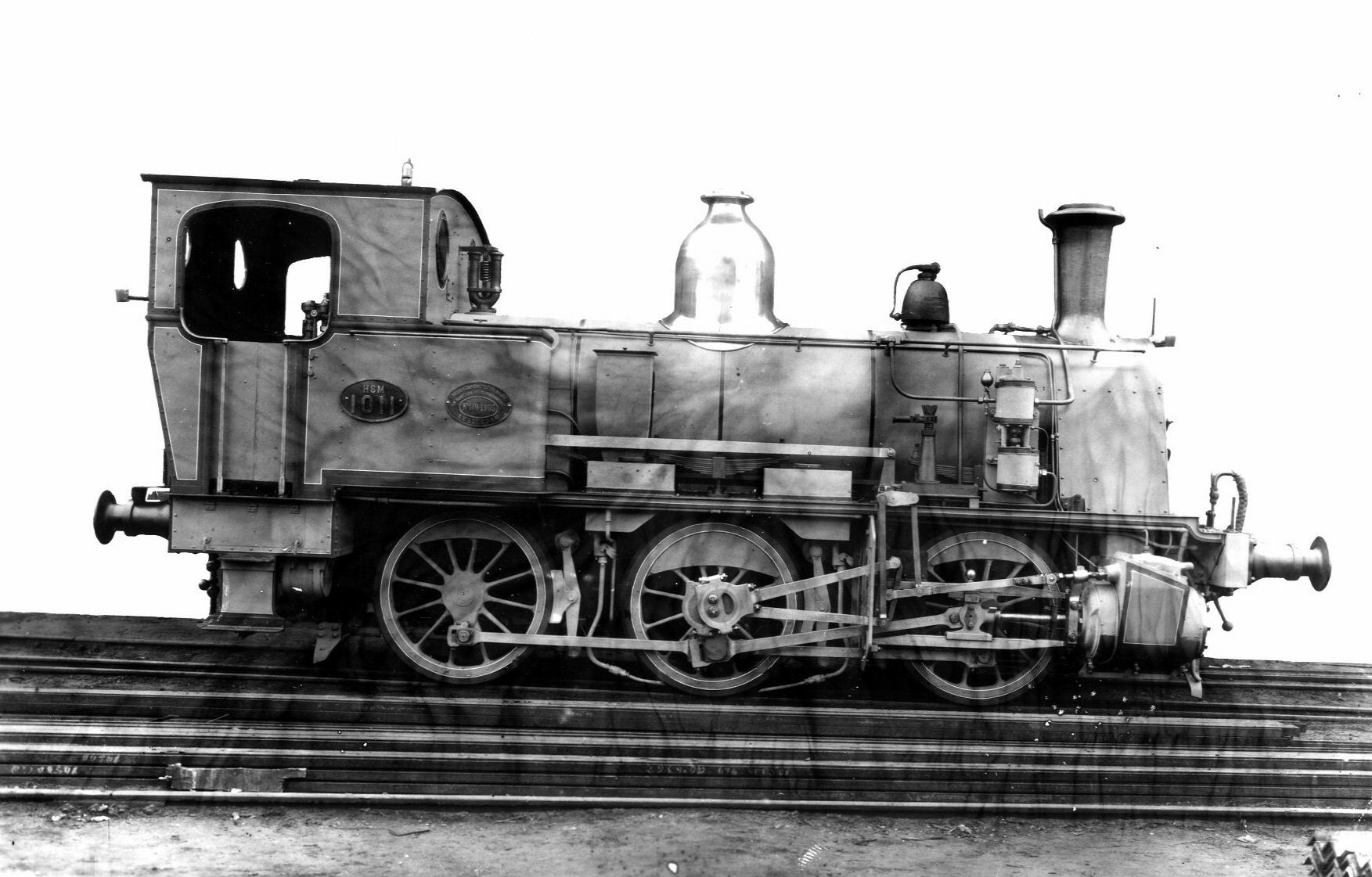
NS 7707 / HSM 1011 with a shorter chimney than the rest of the locomotive series (1905)

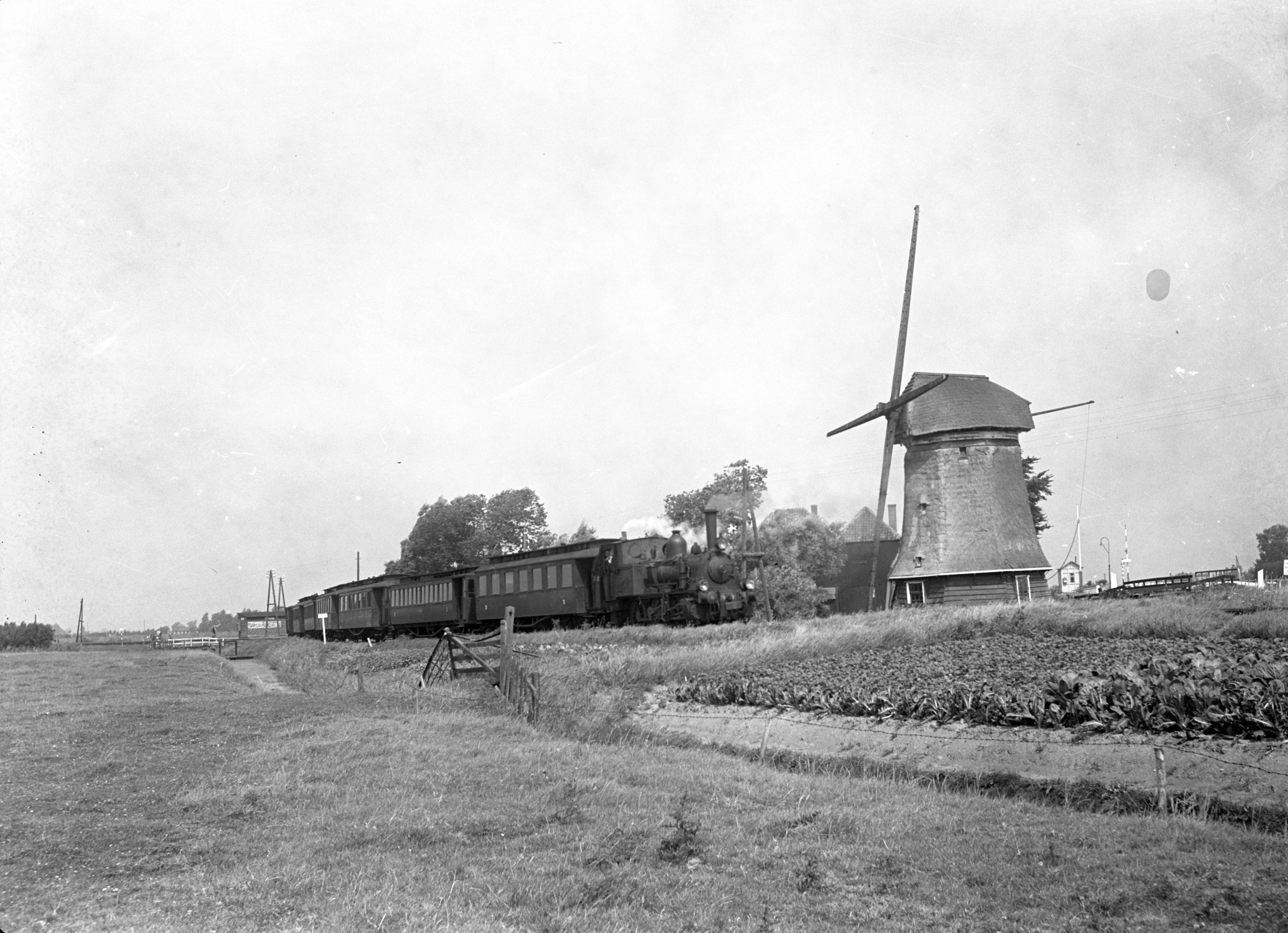
NS 7742 with carriages en route between Bergen and Alkmaar, near the mill in Koedijk; 1953.

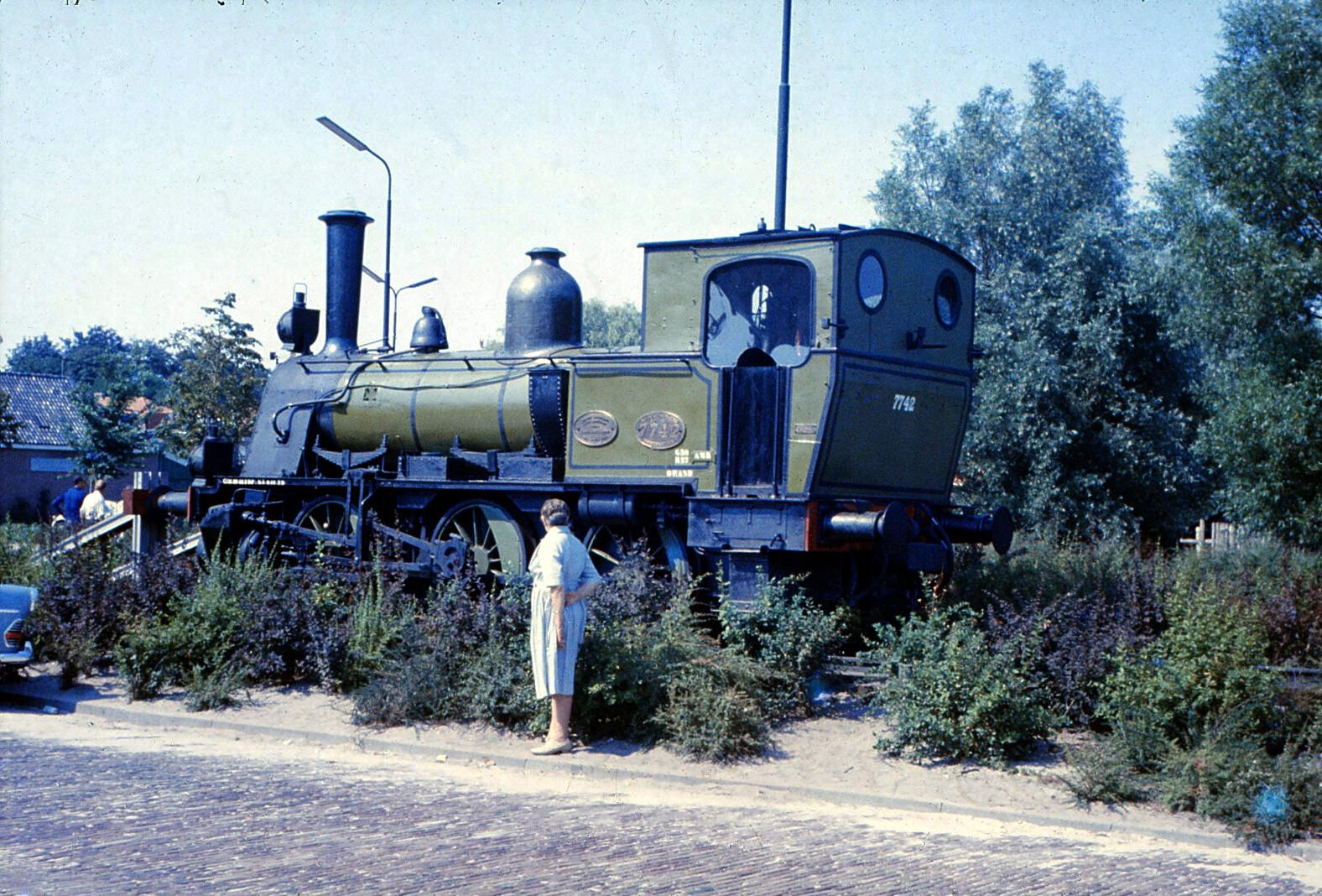
Bello as a monument in Bergen.

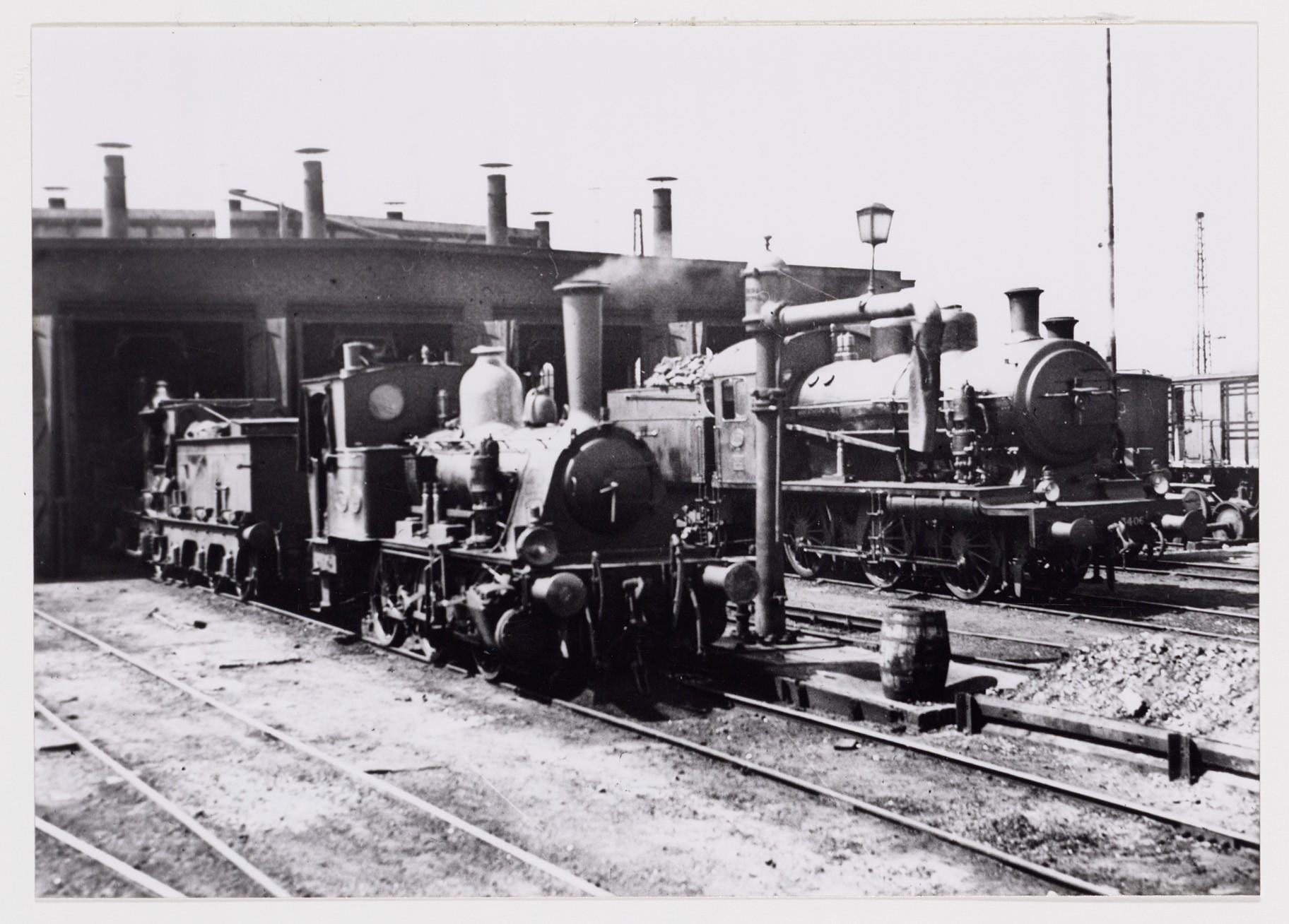
Steam locomotives at the depot of Alkmaar. (23-06-1935)

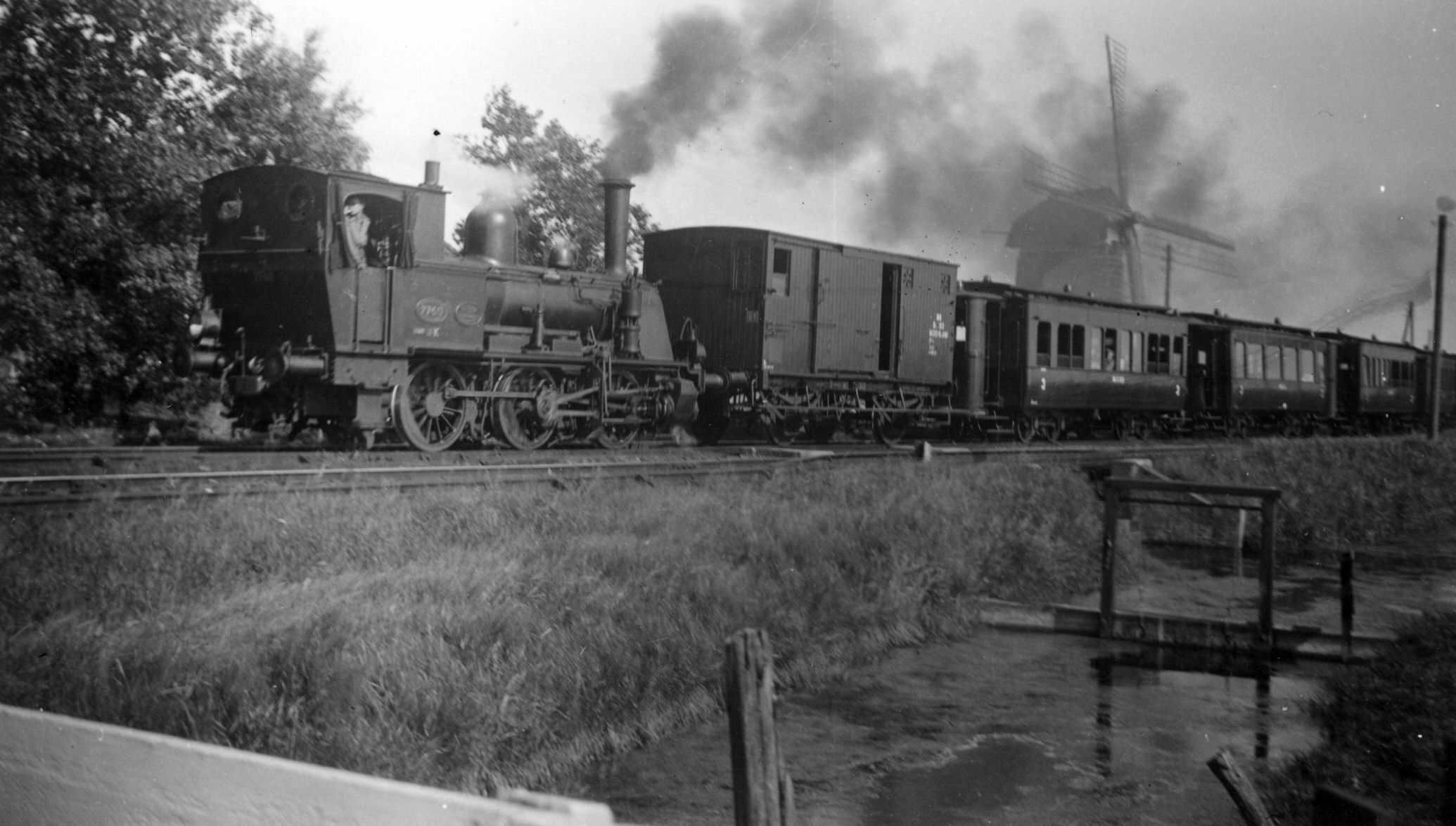
NS 7744 with a tram Alkmaar-Warmenhuizen near Koedijk. (21-07-1947)

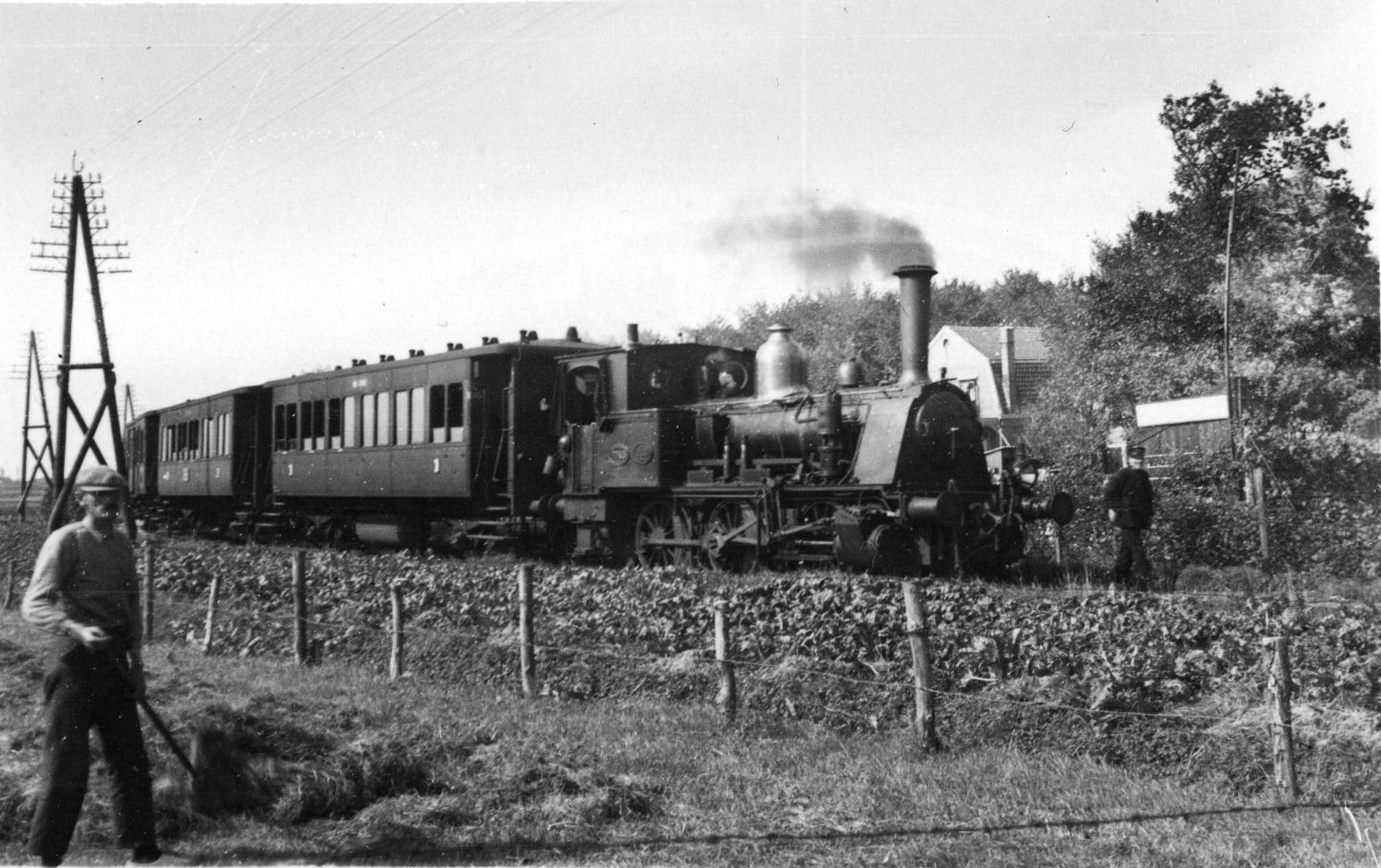
NS 7743 with a tram near Egmond aan de Hoef. (1934)

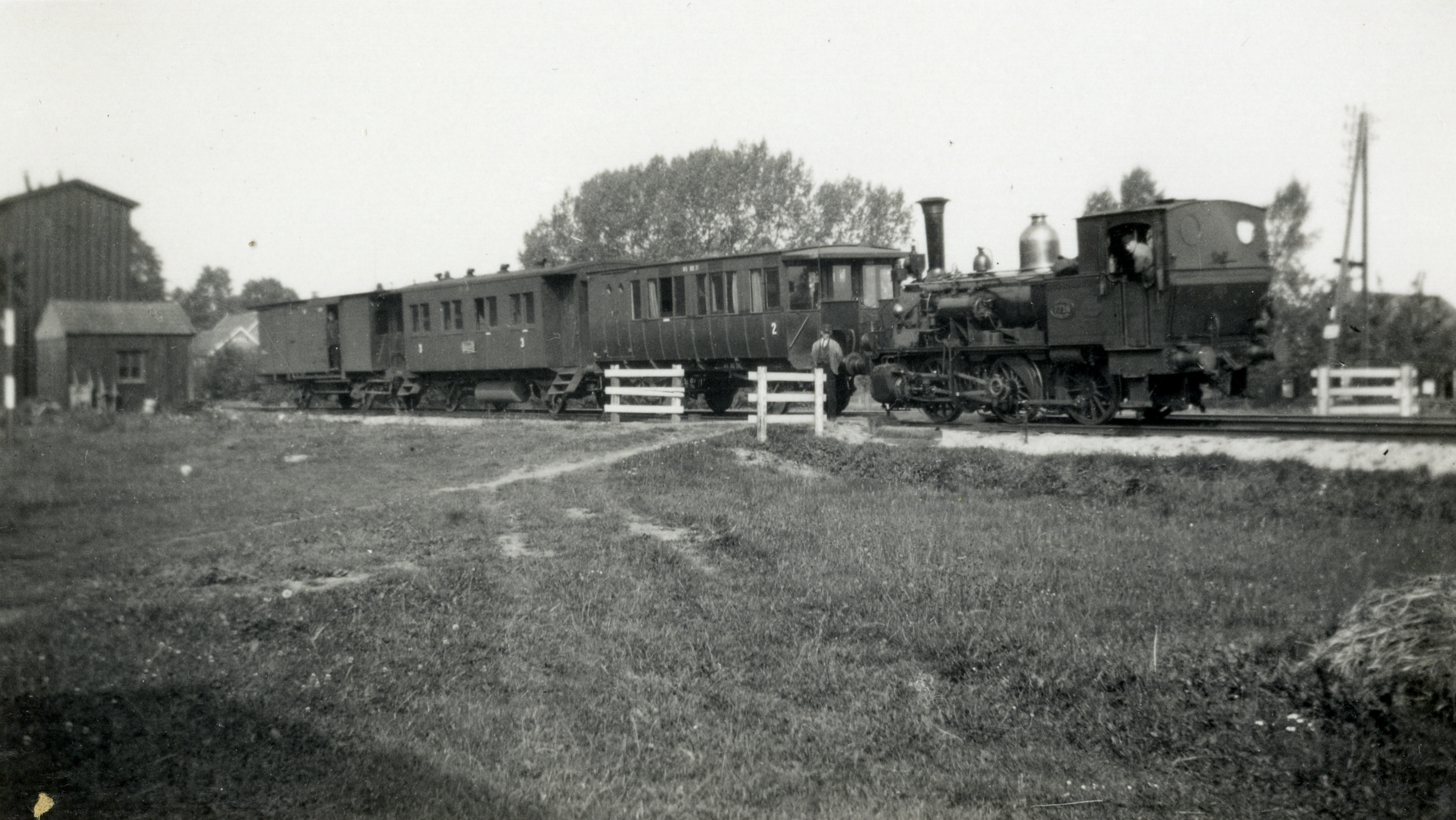
NS 7716 with a train to Dinxperlo, departing from Varsseveld station. (1925 - 1935)

== Sources ==
- hvb-nh.nl Historische Vereniging Bergen - Stoomloc NS 7742 "Bello"
- nicospilt.com/Loc7742.htm Stoomloc NS 7742 "Bello"
- S. Selleger: Bello, uitgeverij Pirola, Schoorl, 1979. ISBN 90-6455-016-6
- H. Waldorp: Onze Nederlandse stoomlocomotieven in woord en beeld, uitgeverij De Alk, Alkmaar, 1981 (5e druk). ISBN 90-6013-909-7
- H. Waldorp: Onze Nederlandse Stoomlocomotieven, uitgeverij De Alk, Alkmaar, 1986 (7e druk). ISBN 90-6013-947-X
- "De Stoomtram" nrs. 22-28
- J. van der Meer: De Hollandsche IJzeren Spoorweg-Maatschappij, uitgeverij Uquilair, 2009, ISBN 978-90-71513-68-8
- Remmo Statius Muller: Trams en treinen in de jaren 30 tot '50 uit het archief van M. van Notten, uitgeverij Elmar, Rijswijk, 1987. ISBN 90-6120-541-7
- H. de Herder: Nederlandse industrielocomotieven. Uitg. Uquilair, 2007. ISBN 90-71513-59-9
