= NS 5600 =

Dutch 2-4-0 (later 4-4-0, then 4-4-4T) locomotives

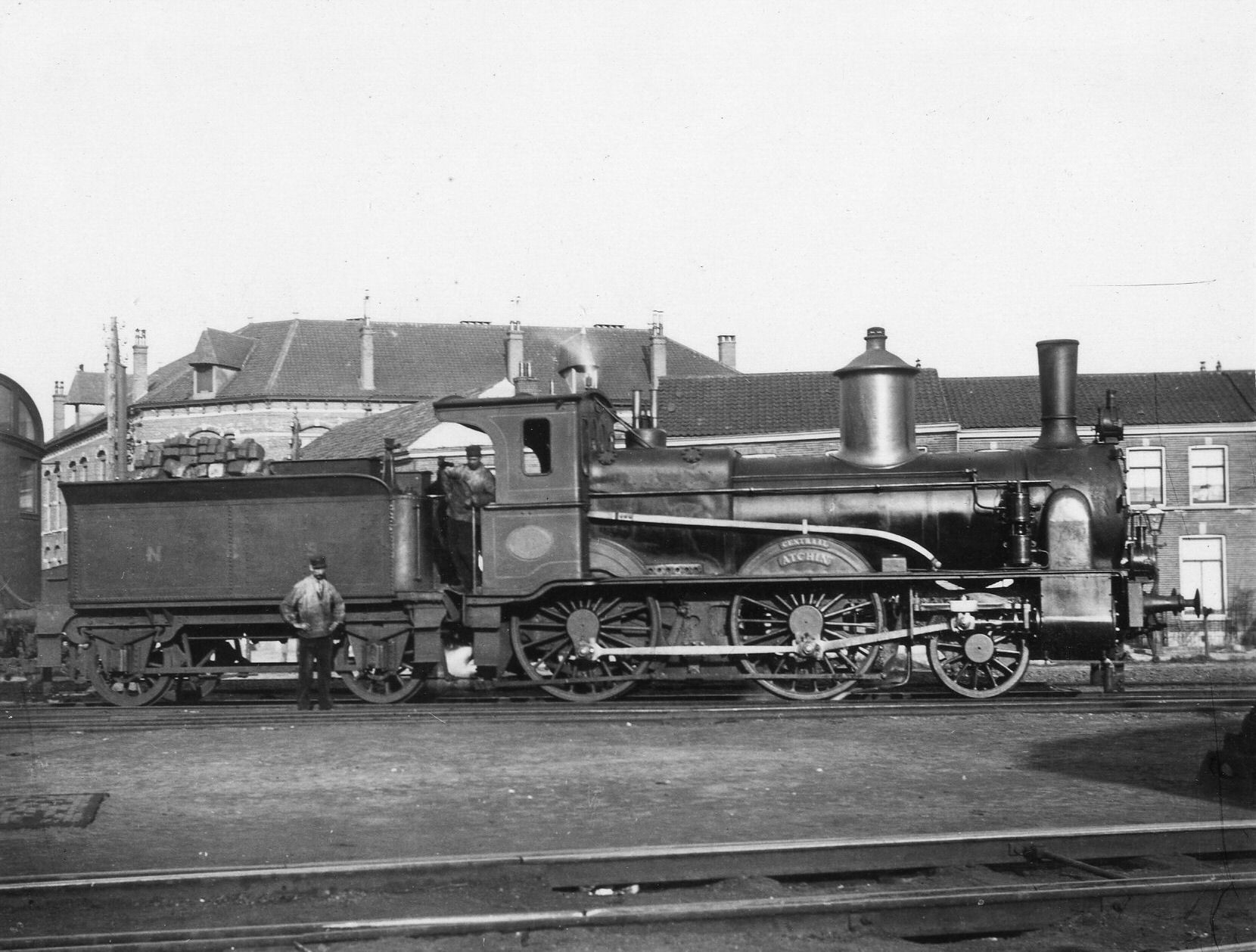
- No. 17 "Atchin" of the N.C.S. in Utrecht.
Type and origin
- Power type: Steam
- Builder: Hanomag
- Build date: 1874 - 1876
Specifications
- Configuration
  - Whyte: 2-4-0, later: 4-4-0, 4-4-4
  - UIC: 1'B, later: 2'B, 2'B2'
Career
- Operators: NCS, SS, NS
- Withdrawn: 1925 - 1927
- Disposition: All scrapped
- For a more detailed Specifications, see Specifications

The NS 5600 was a series of steam locomotives of the Dutch Railways (NS) and its predecessors Maatschappij tot Exploitatie van Staatsspoorwegen (SS) and Nederlandsche Centraal-Spoorweg-Maatschappij (NCS).

== Delivery with the 1'B wheel arrangement ==
The Pommersche Centralbahn, founded in 1870, ordered a number of steam locomotives for the new railway line from Wangerin via Neustettin to Konitz from the locomotive factory of George Egestorff in Hanover, since 1871 called Hanomag. As a result of the Franco-Prussian War, the Pommersche Centralbahn ran into financial difficulties and was filed for bankruptcy in 1873, after which the order with Hanomag was also cancelled. The locomotives already under construction were stored in the warehouse.

When the NCS placed an order for three 1'B locomotives at Hanomag in 1874, the partly built locomotives for the Pommersche Centralbahn were completed for the NCS. These entered service in 1874 with the numbers 16-18 and the names Kraton, Atchin and Sumatra. Two years later, the NCS placed a follow-up order for two locomotives, which were put into service in 1876 as the 19–20 with the names Java and Borneo. They were 1'B locomotives with a four-wheeled tender.

== Rebuilding into a 2'B wheel arrangement ==
In 1882 and 1883, No. 19 and 18 respectively were fitted with a new boiler. Between 1891 and 1897 all boilers were replaced by boilers with a maximum steam pressure of 10 kg/cm2 (142.2 psi), starting with No. 17, followed by No. 20, 16, 19 and 18. With No. 18, to reduce the axle load, the front barrel axle replaced by two barrel axles, making the wheel arrangement 2'B. The other locomotives were rebuilt accordingly between 1900 and 1905, whereby the four-wheeled tender was also replaced by a larger six-wheeled tender from the series 21–25. The tender of No. 18 was replaced in 1901.

== Rebuilding into a tender engine with the 2'B2' wheel arrangement ==
A second major rebuild took place in between 1913 and 1915, during which the five locomotives were rebuilt into 2'B2' (4-4-4) tank engines for local service. The frame was extended and supported by a two-axle bogie. The cab was replaced, a water tank was placed on both sides of the boiler and behind the cab a coal bunker was fitted. During this rebuild, the cylinder castings were also replaced by ones with a large diameter and the locomotives were also fitted with a superheater.

== Merger into the SS and later the NS ==
In 1919 the operation of the NCS was taken over by the SS, with these locomotives being included in the SS numbering as 81-85 (second occupation of these numbers). When the fleet of the SS and the Hollandsche IJzeren Spoorweg-Maatschappij was merged in 1921, the locomotives of this series were given the NS numbers 5601–5605. These locomotives were withdrawn from service between 1925 and 1927.

== Specifications ==
NS 5600
Period	1874-1905	1897-1905	1900-1927
Typ	Original locomotive with tender	Rebuild with a new boiler and a second front axle	Rebuilding into tank engines
Amount	5	5	5
Numbering NCS	16-20	16-20	16-20
Numbering SS	-		81-85
Numbering NS	-		5601-5606
Builder	Hanomag	NCS Workshop Utrecht	NCS Workshop Utrecht
Entered service	1874-1876	1897-1905	1900-1905
Withdrawn	1897-1905	1900-1905	1925-1927
Wheel arrangement	1'B (2-4-0)	2'B (4-4-0)	2'B2' (4-4-4)
Gauge	1435 mm		
Locomotive weight	34.5 t (38.0 short tons; 34.0 long tons)	Unknown	72.4 t (79.8 short tons; 71.3 long tons)
tender weight	23.1 t (25.5 short tons; 22.7 long tons)	23.1 t (25.5 short tons; 22.7 long tons)	Unknown
Midline driving wheels	1,728 mm (5 ft 8.0 in), later: 1,760 mm (5 ft 9 in)	1,760 mm (5 ft 9 in)	1,760 mm (5 ft 9 in)
Midline leading wheels	1,054 mm (3 ft 5.5 in), later: 1,086 mm (3 ft 6.8 in)	1,086 mm (3 ft 6.8 in)	Front: 1,086 mm (3 ft 6.8 in), Rear: 1,184 mm (3 ft 10.6 in)
Midline tender wheels	1,152 mm (3 ft 9.4 in), later: 1,184 mm (3 ft 10.6 in)	1,184 mm (3 ft 10.6 in)	Unknown
Length	13,590 mm (44 ft 7 in)	15,857 mm (52 ft 0.3 in)	13,823 mm (45 ft 4.2 in)
Height	4,087 mm (13 ft 4.9 in), later: 4,000 mm (13 ft 1 in)	4,134 mm (13 ft 6.8 in)	4,181 mm (13 ft 8.6 in)
Max speed	Unknown	Unknown	90 km/h (56 mph)
Firebox heating area	7 m^{2} (75 sq ft)	Unknown	8 m^{2} (86 sq ft)
Tubes area	90 m^{2} (970 sq ft)	Unknown	94 m^{2} (1,010 sq ft) or 75 m^{2} (810 sq ft)
Superheater area	Unknown	Unknown	33 m^{2} (360 sq ft)
Firegrate area	1.48 m^{2} (15.9 sq ft)	Unknown	1.80 m^{2} (19.4 sq ft)
Boiler pressure	9 kg/cm^{2} (130 psi), later 10 kg/cm^{2} (140 psi)	9 kg/cm^{2} (130 psi), later 10 kg/cm^{2} (140 psi)	10 kg/cm^{2} (140 psi)
Amount of cylinders	2		
Cylinder size	418 x 576 mm (16.45 x 22.67 in)	Unknown	460 x 576 mm (18.11 x 22.67 in)
Valve gear	Allan		
Water capacity	8.7 m^{3} (1,900 imp gal)	8.7 m^{3} (1,900 imp gal), later 12 m^{3} (2,600 imp gal)	10 m^{3} (2,200 imp gal)
Fuel capacity	4 t (4.4 short tons; 3.9 long tons)	4 t (4.4 short tons; 3.9 long tons)	3 t (3.3 short tons; 3.0 long tons)
Tractive effort	35.99 kN (8,090 lbf)	Unknown	49.03 kN (11,020 lbf)
Power class	Unknown		PTO^{1}

== Overview ==
Factory number	Name	NCS number	Date built	Reboilered with a bigger boiler	Rebuild into 2'B (2-4-0)	Date received a 6-wheeled tender	Tender came from loco No.	Date rebuild into 2'B2' (4-4-4) tank engine	SS number	NS number	Withdrawn	Notes
1045	Kraton	16	1874	1895	1900	1900	25	1915	81	5601	1926	
1046	Atchin	17	1874	1891	1903	1903	22	1916	82	5602	1925	
1047	Sumatra	18	1874	1897	1897	1901	24	1913	83	5603	1925	
1351	Java	19	1876	1896	1905	1905	23	1913	84	5604	1927	
1352	Borneo	20	1876	1894	1902	1902	25 (21)	1914	85	5605	1927	Original tender of No. 21 placed behind No. 25 in 1901

== Sources and references ==
- N. J. van Wijck Jurriaanse: De Nederlandsche Centraal Spoorwegmaatschappij. Uitg. Wyt, Rotterdam, 1973. ISBN 90-6007-527-7.
- Het Utrechts archief
