= NS 7000 =

Dutch steam locomotive class

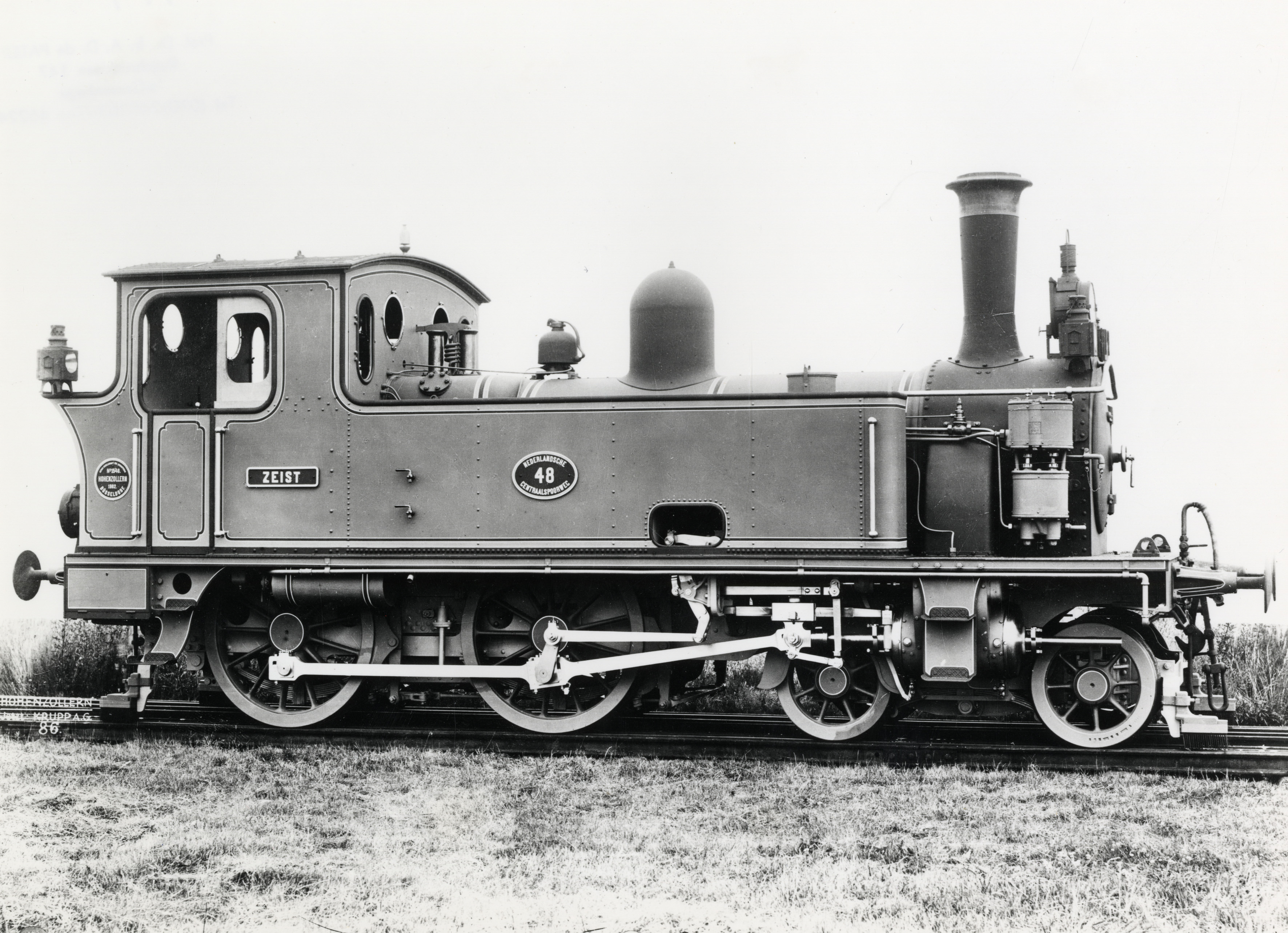
Type and origin
- Power type: Steam
- Builder: Sächsische Maschinenfabrik, Hohenzollern
- Build date: 1899–1903
- Total produced: 10
Specifications
- Configuration
  - Whyte: 4-4-0T
  - UIC: 2'B
- Gauge: 1,435 mm (4 ft 8 1/2 in)
- Leading dia.: 800 mm (2 ft 7 in)
- Driver dia.: 1,350 mm (4 ft 5 in)
- Length
  - Over beams: 8,930 mm (29 ft 4 in)
- Height: 3,800 mm (12 ft 6 in)
- Loco weight: 37 t (41 short tons; 36 long tons)
- Fuel type: Coal
- Fuel capacity: 1 t (1.1 short tons; 0.98 long tons)
- Water cap.: 3.5 m^{3} (770 imp gal)
- Firebox
  - Grate area: 1.04 m^{2} (11.2 sq ft)
- Boiler pressure: 12 kg/cm^{2} (170 psi)
- Heating surface
  - Firebox: 5 m^{2} (54 sq ft)
  - Tubes: 48 m^{2} (520 sq ft)
- Superheater
  - Heating area: 20 m^{2} (220 sq ft)
- Cylinders: 2
- Cylinder size: 360 mm × 500 mm (14 in × 20 in)
- Valve gear: Walschaerts
Performance figures
- Maximum speed: 75 km/h (47 mph)
- Tractive effort: 4,030 kgf (8,900 lbf)
Career
- Operators: NS, SS and NCS
- Power class: NS: LO
- Numbers: NCS: 41–50; SS: 151–160; NS: 7001–7010
- Withdrawn: 1947 - 1954
- Disposition: All scrapped

The NS 7000 was a series of tank engines of the Dutch Railways (NS) and its predecessors Maatschappij tot Exploitatie van Staatsspoorwegen (SS) and Nederlandsche Centraal-Spoorweg-Maatschappij (NCS).

== History ==
In 1899, the NCS bought a tank engine from the Sächsische Machinenfabrik in Chemnitz for use on the local railway lines. Inspiration was taken from the 2.311 to 2.380 series of the French Compagnie des chemins de fer du Nord. After the locomotive entered service and proven itself with the NCS, a follow-up order was placed for four more locomotives, which were put into service in 1901 as 42–45. No. 41 was delivered in the original green NCS livery, but Nos. 42-45 were painted in the new ocher yellow livery introduced in 1901 with olive green bands with white and red piping. In 1901 all five locomotives 41-45 were sold to the Nederlandsche Buurtspoorweg-Maatschappij (NBM).

In 1902, a batch of three locomotives (Nos. 46-48) was delivered with another batch of two locomotives (Nos. 49–50) arriving the following year, these being built by Hohenzollern in Düsseldorf-Grafenberg.

== Modifications ==
All ten locomotives were built without a superheater. In 1909, Nos. 42 and 48 were fitted with a smokebox superheater, after favorable results had been obtained with express locomotives Nos. 19 and 21. After the superheater also produced favorable results with Nos. 42 and 48, Nos. 43, 47 and 50 were also fitted in 1910 and 1911. The superheater of No. 48 was removed in 1912 and received a fully occupied superheater. No. 41 received a flame tube superheater from Werkspoor in Amsterdam in 1914. In 1916 the NCS bought back the five locomotives sold to the NBM.

In 1919, the NCS was taken over by the SS, with these locomotives being included in the SS numbering as Nos. 151–160. When the locomotive and rolling stock fleets of the HSM and the SS was merged in 1921, the locomotives of this series were given the NS numbers 7001–7010. The NS continued the fitting of superheaters, so that eventually all locomotives of this series were equipped with a superheater. Other changes carried out by the NS involved the installation of a sandbox on the boiler around 1924 and the removal of the bell after 1938.

== In and After NS service ==
The NS used these locomotives, among other routes, on the Haarlemmermeer lines, to replace the series 7700.

From 1954 onwards, No. 7001 was used by the NS on the NTM line between Groningen and Drachten. No. 7001 was the last former NCS locomotive to be withdrawn in 1954, after which the locomotive served for several months as a static boiler for the Wilco factory in Assen. In 1955 the engine was scrapped in Veenendaal, after 55 years of service and 2.2 million kilometers traveled.

NS 7009 was sold to the Kempensche Zinc company in Budel in 1951. The locomotive remained there under its NS number until 1967, when it was sold for scrap.

Builder	Lot no.	Built	NCS number	SS number	NS number	Withdrawn	Notes
Sächsische Machinenfabrik	2471	1899	41	151	7001	1954	
Sächsische Machinenfabrik	2472	1901	42	152	7002	1952	
Sächsische Machinenfabrik	2473	1901	43	153	7003	1951	
Sächsische Machinenfabrik	2474	1901	44	154	7004	1952	
Sächsische Machinenfabrik	2475	1901	45	155	7005	1952	
Hohenzollern	1544	1902	46	156	7006	1954	
Hohenzollern	1545	1902	47	157	7007	1948	
Hohenzollern	1546	1902	48	158	7008	1953	Briefly named "zeist"
Hohenzollern	1618	1903	49	159	7009	1951	
Hohenzollern	1619	1903	50	160	7010	1947	

== Gallery ==
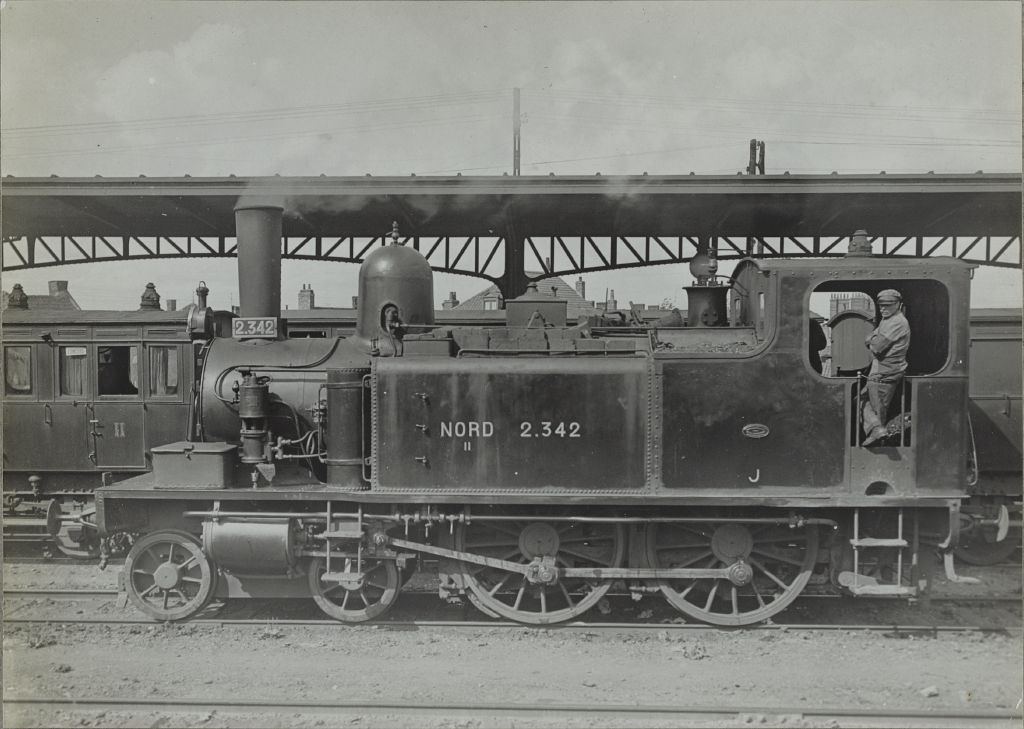
The locomotive that inspired the NS 7000 serie. (Du Nord 2.342)

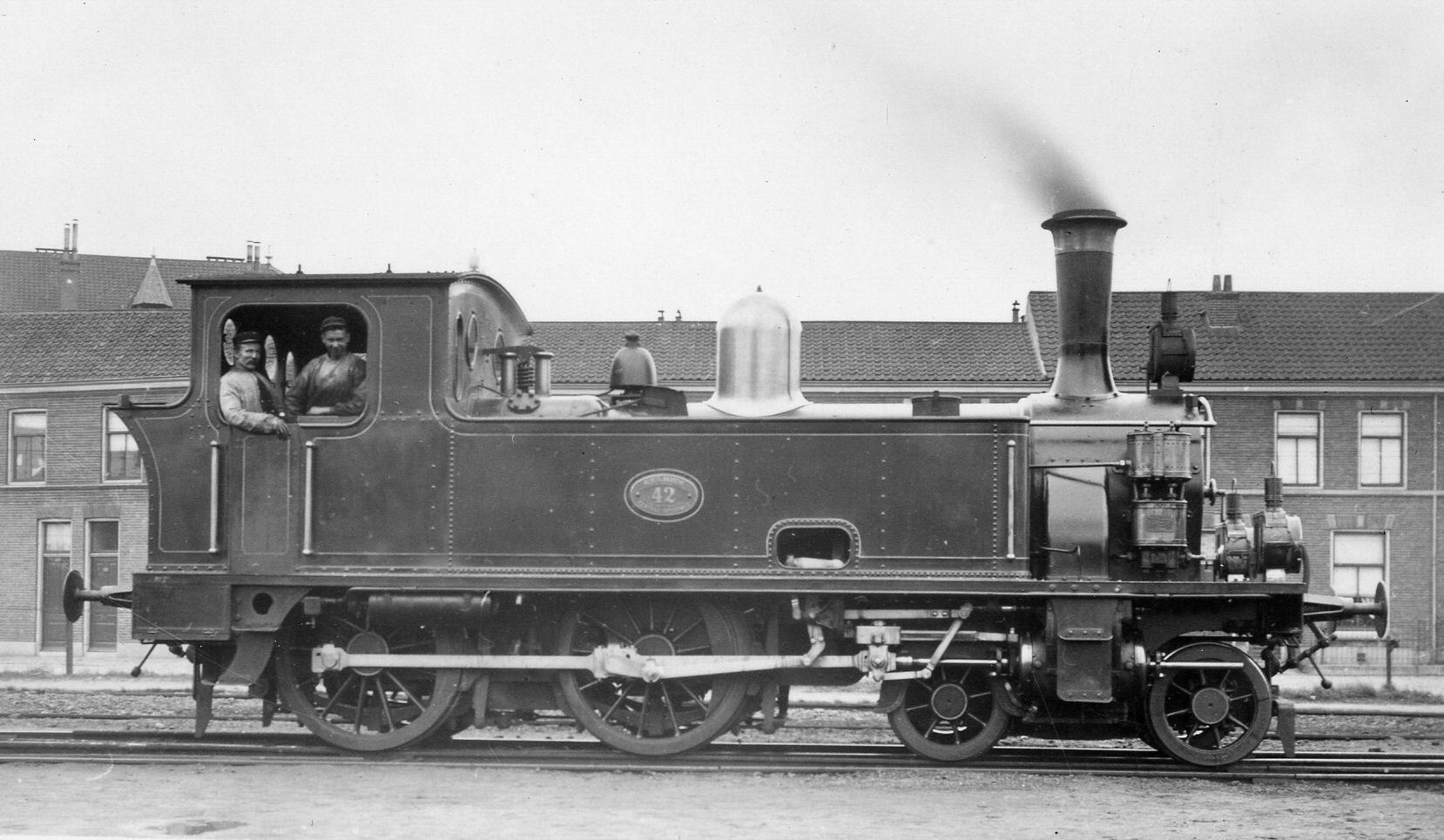
Steam locomotive no. 42 of the NCS (series 41–50, later series 151-160 of the SS and series 7000 of the NS) in Utrecht, near the Boorstraat.

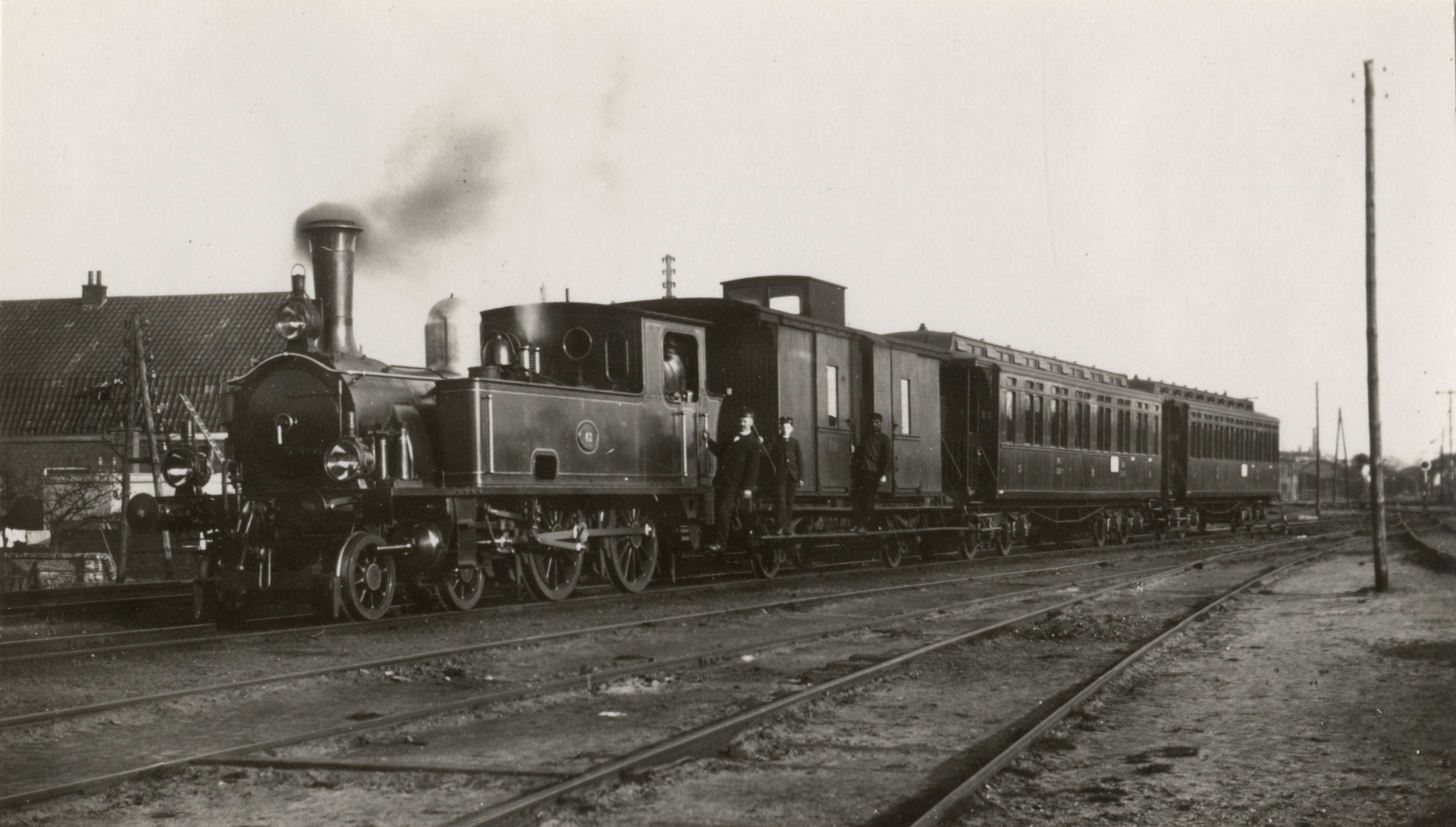
Steam locomotive no. 42 of the NCS (series 41–50, later series 151-160 of the SS and series 7000 of the NS) with a local service in Utrecht.

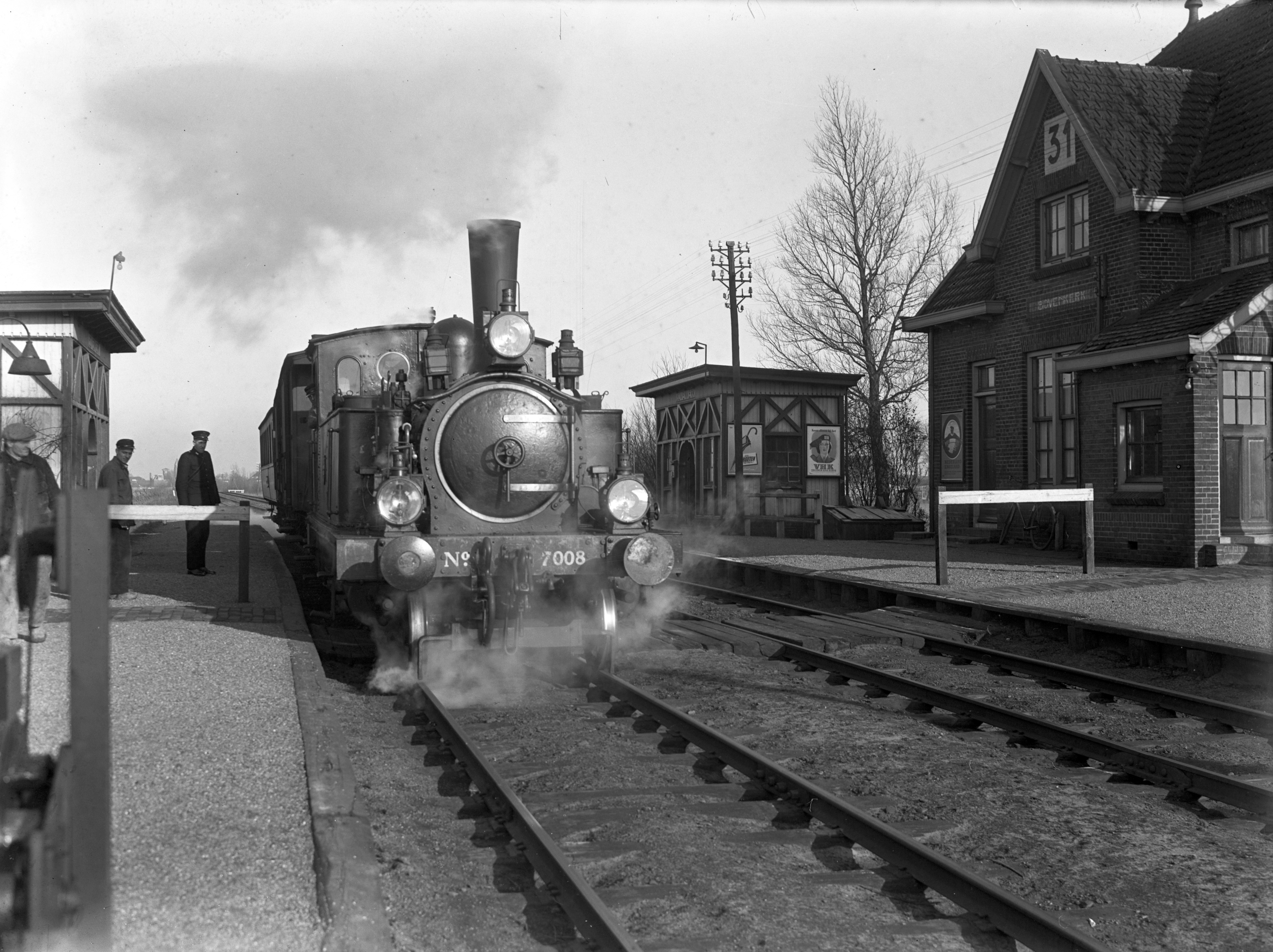
Steam locomotive no. 7008 (series 7000) of the NS with carriages along the platform of the Bovenkerk station.

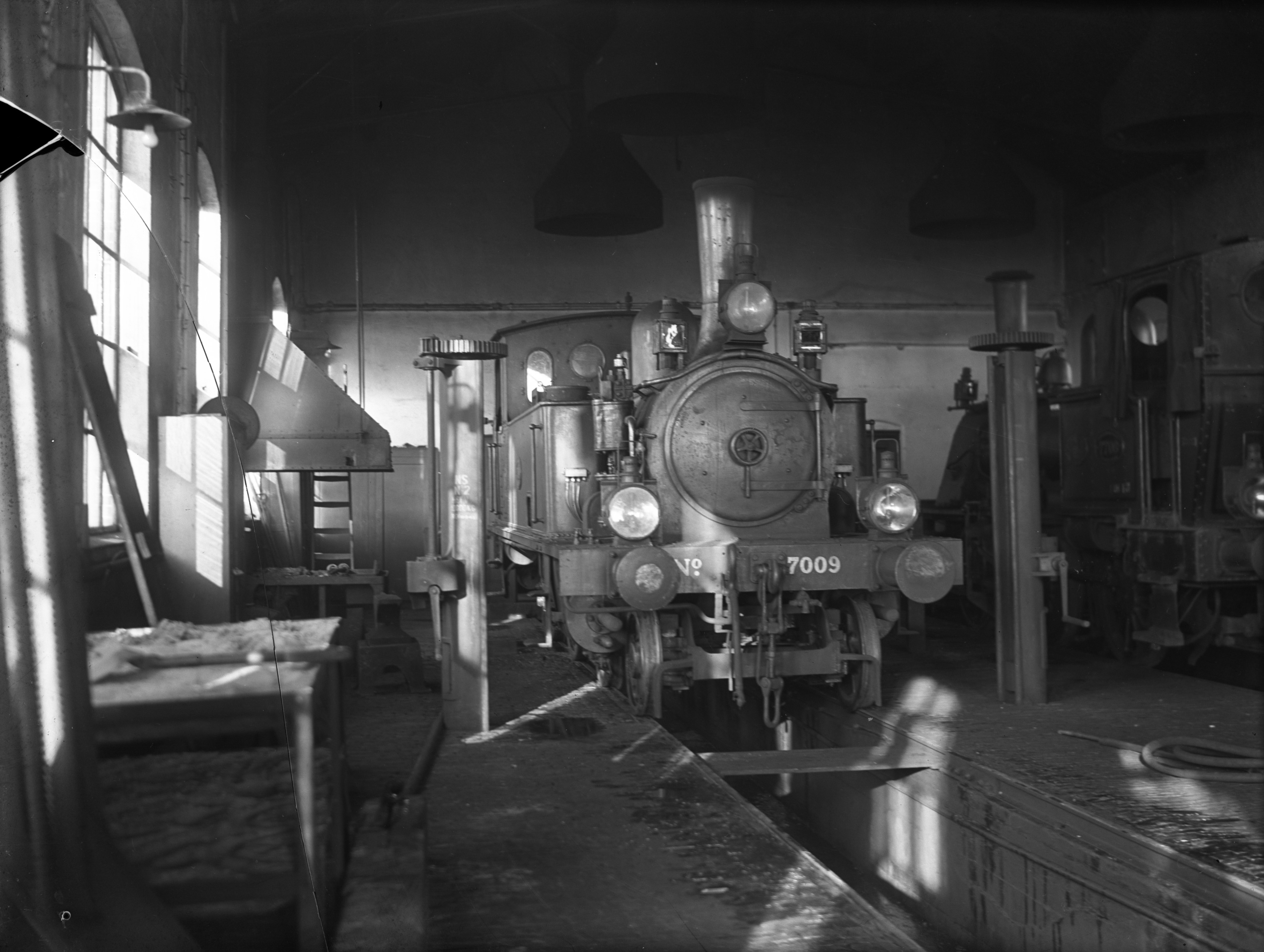
Steam locomotive no. 7009 (series 7000) of the NS in the locomotive shed in Uithoorn.

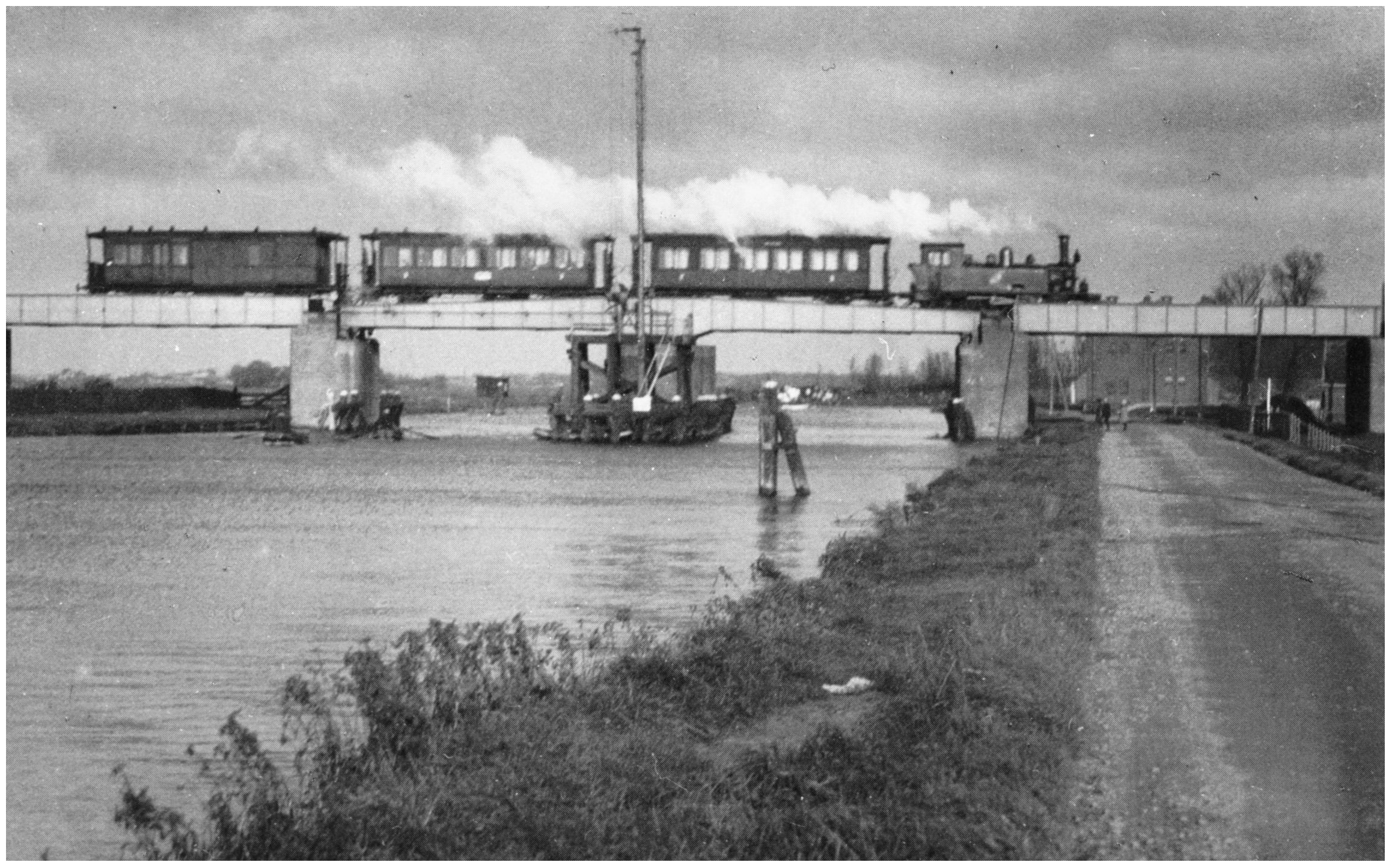
A train with an NS 7000 on the swing bridge over the Zijl near Leiden; circa 1930.

== Sources ==
- A. Weijts: Tussen vuur en stoom. Uitg. Europese Bibliotheek, Zaltbommel, 2001. ISBN 90-288-2694-7.
