= Geldersch-Overijsselsche Spoorweg Maatschappij =

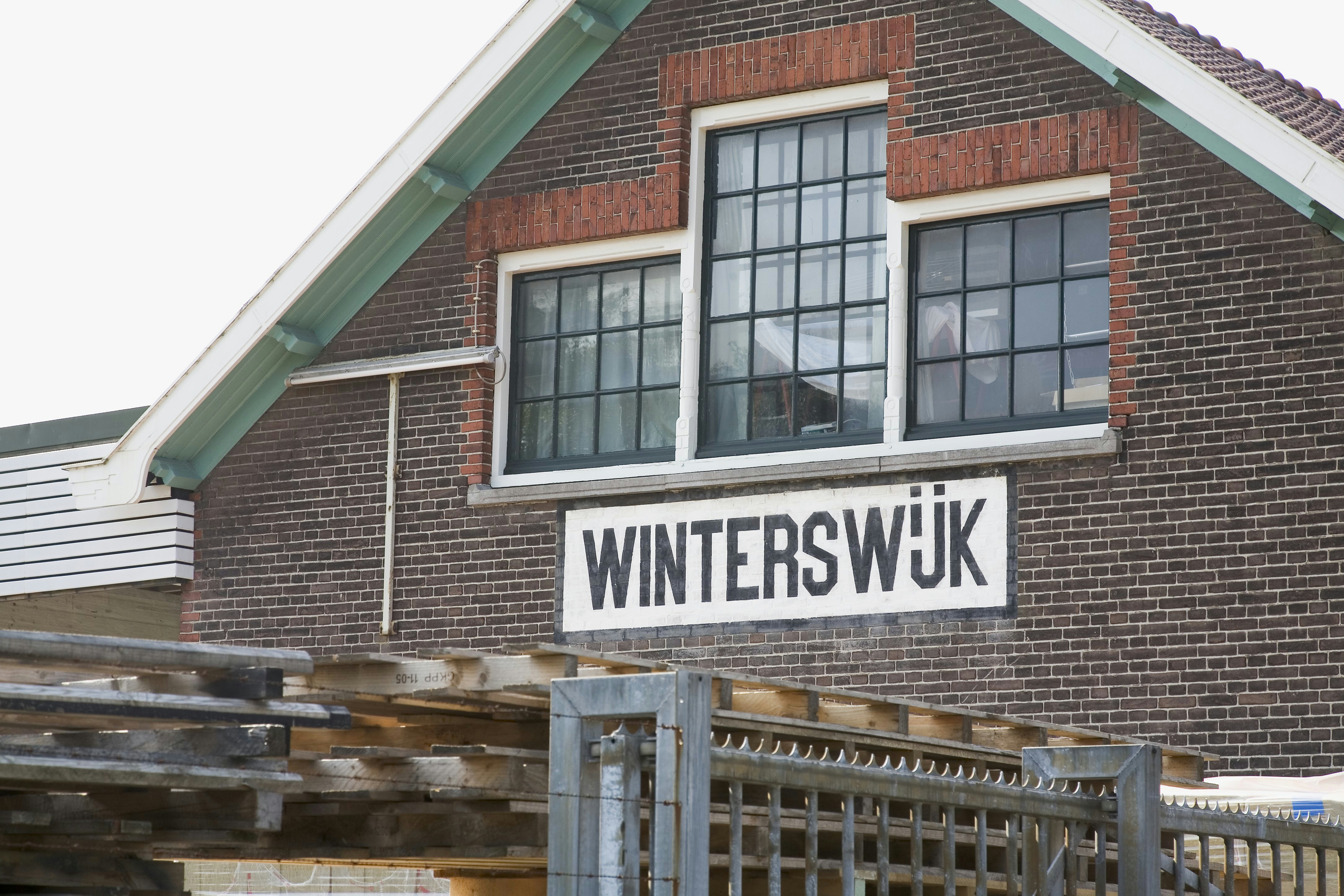
- Front of the former Winterswijk GOLS station
- Company type: Maatschappij (Group practice)
- Industry: Railways
- Founded: June 18, 1881; 144 years ago in Winterswijk, Gelderland, Netherlands
- Founder: Jan Willink
- Defunct: 1928
- Fate: Acquired by Staatsspoorwegen
- Headquarters: Winterswijk, Netherlands
- Number of locations: 17 stations (1928)
- Areas served: Gelderland, Overijssel, Twente
- Owner: Jan Willink

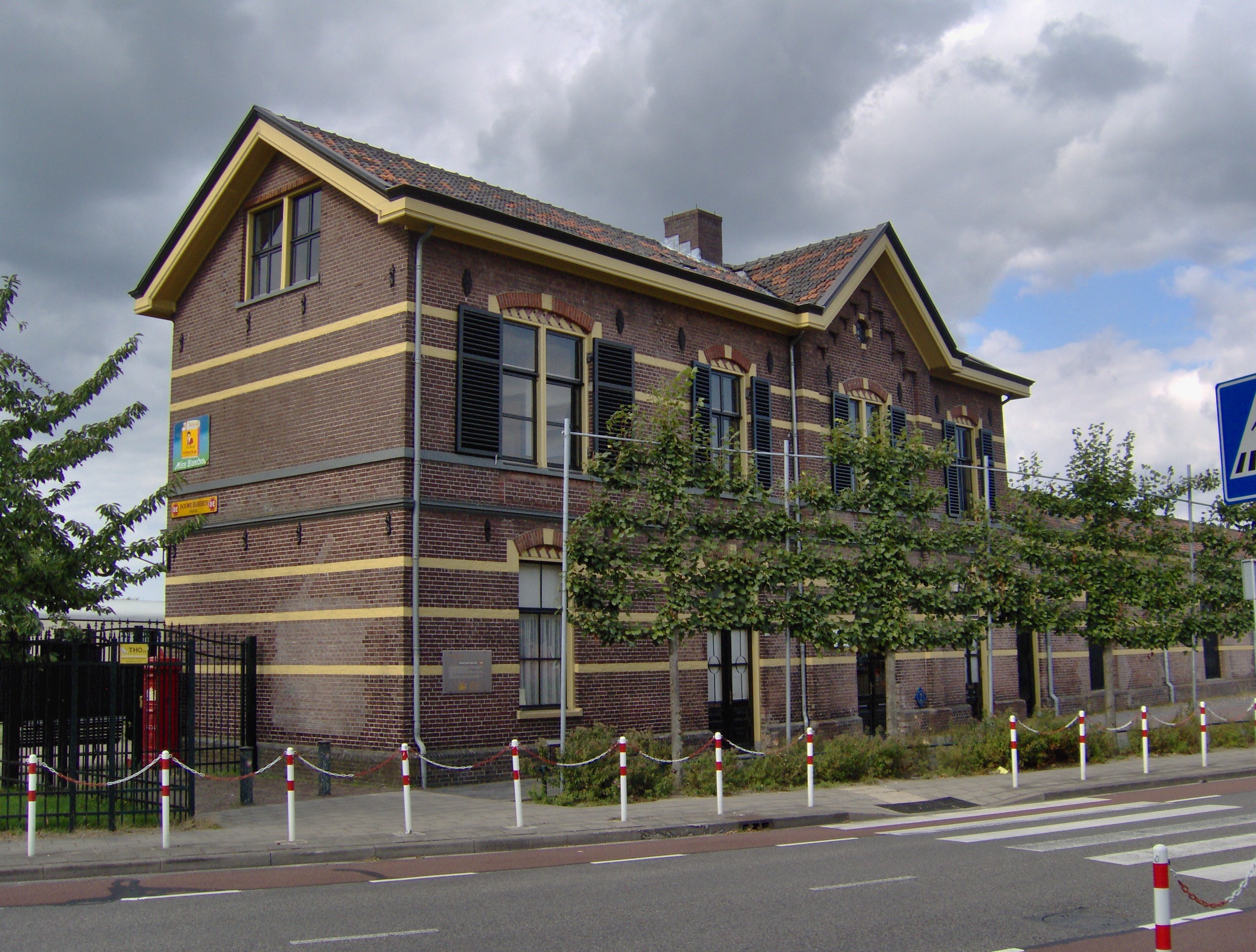
Haaksbergen Station, now in use by the Museum Buurtspoorweg

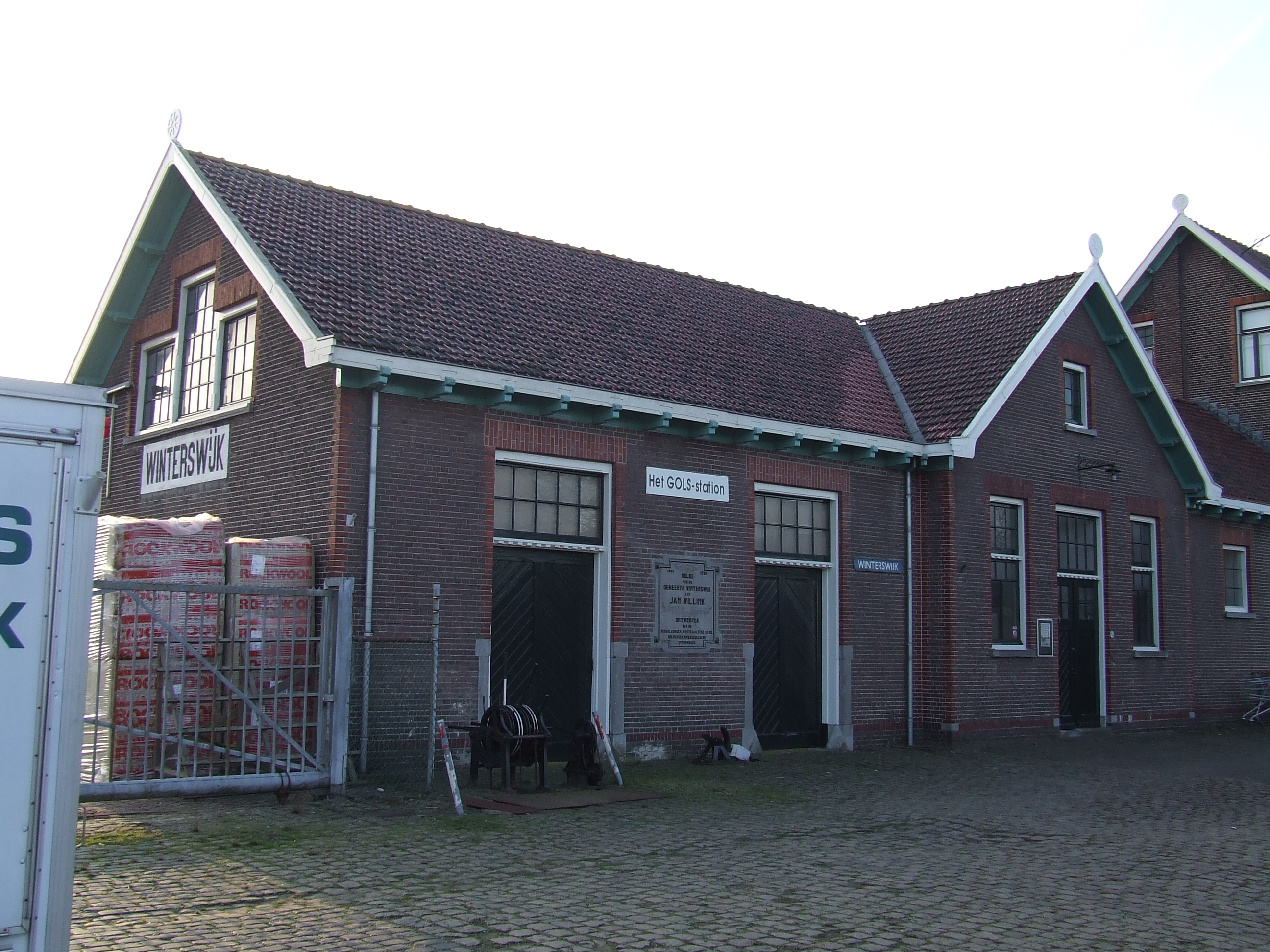
Former Winterswijk-GOLS station, now a GOLS museum

The Geldersch-Overijsselsche Lokaalspoorweg-Maatschappij (GOLS) was a railway company that owned and serviced several railways in the Dutch provinces of Gelderland and Overijssel. The company was founded by Jan Willink, a textile producer from Winterswijk, who had created the Borken - Winterswijk - Zutphen railway in 1878.

== Creation ==
On August 9, 1878, the Dutch law on Local Railways and Tramways was enacted. It facilitated the creation of cheaper railway networks throughout the Netherlands by addressing a number of requirements, such as staffed signal boxes. According to the new legislation, train speed could not exceed 30 km/h. This enabled the laying of lighter and cheaper rail.

The construction of local railways began due to the request local textile producers who required a railway between Winterswijk, Groenlo, Eibergen, Neede, Haaksbergen, and Hengelo / Enschede. A committee was created that sought to ensure the development of a railway to Enschede. This railway had to create a connection to the Ruhr. The line joined to two already-existing lines servicing Germany in Winterswijk.

On June 18, 1881, Jan Willink created the GOLS network, which would service two main lines and two branches:

- Winterswijk - Hengelo
  - Boekelo - Enschede
- Winterswijk - Zevenaar
  - Doetinchem - Ruurlo

The lines Winterswijk-Hengelo and Ruurlo-Neede were opened on October 15, 1884. The line between Winterswijk and Zevenaar opened on July 15 of 1885 but quickly lost popularity among the textile producers. On December 7, 1885, a connection between Boekelo and Enschede was created bringing the total length of the GOLS network to 131 kilometers.

== Exploitation ==
The servicing of trains was outsourced to the Staatsspoorwegen (SS). They ran services on the newly opened Betuwelijn railway between Elst and Rotterdam and could have potentially connected to the GOLS-network creating a valuable connection between Rotterdam and Enschede. Willink arranged a deal with the Staatsspoorwegen in 1882 enabling them to immediately purchase five new steam trains. This caused the Dutch Government to assume the SS would get too much market share in the railroad industry. Instead, the exploitation of the GOLS lines was outsourced to the Hollandsche IJzeren Spoorweg-Maatschappij. The Staatsspoorwegen did not approve of this measure and barred the GOLS from using its network. This led to the creation of new GOLS stations in Zevenaar and Winterswijk.

== The end of GOLS ==
The Hollandsche IJzeren Spoorweg-Maatschappij (HSM) had plans to purchase the GOLS since 1893 but never succeeded. In 1920, the HSM was given approval from the Dutch government to purchase the Eschede - Oldenzaal line, and six years later, the HSM took over the first line in the province of Twente, the Almelo - Salzbergen, which led to two railroad companies having a shared monopoly over twenty railroads. Competition decreased further and ended with the fusing of both companies into Nederlandse Spoorwegen.

the GOLS line Winterswijk - Enschede/Hengelo was closed in 1935 when they did not bring in enough profit. Cargo transport between Haaksbergen and Enschede continued until 1972, after which the Museum Buurtspoorweg (MBS) took over the line. Ever since 1974, the MBS has been operating the line between Haaksbergen and Boekelo.

The only other former GOLS line still in use today is the line Winterswijk - Doetinchem - Zevenaar, which is currently used by Arriva and Breng.
