= 5300 =

5300 may refer to:

== In general ==
- A.D. 5300, a year in the 6th millennium CE
- 5300 BC, a year in the 6th millennium BCE
- 5300, a number in the 5000 (number) range

== Electronics and computing ==
- Nokia 5300, a cellphone
- PowerBook 5300, a portable computer
- Power Macintosh 5300, a personal computer

== Rail ==
- Hankyu 5300 series, an electric multiple unit train series
- Meitetsu 5300 series, an electric multiple unit train series
- Toei 5300 series, an electric multiple unit train series
- NS 5300 class locomotive
- Baltimore and Ohio 5300 (built 1927), a particular steam locomotive engine named "President Washington"

== Other uses ==
- 5300 Sats, an asteroid in the Asteroid Belt, the 5300th asteroid registered
- 5300 (District of Kuçovë), one of the postal codes in Albania
- Building 5300, Oak Ridge National Laboratory, Oak Ridge, Tennessee, USA
- Bizzarrini 5300 Spyder S.I., a sports car
