= NS 600 =

Class of 10 Netherlands 2-2-2 (later 0-4-2) locomotives

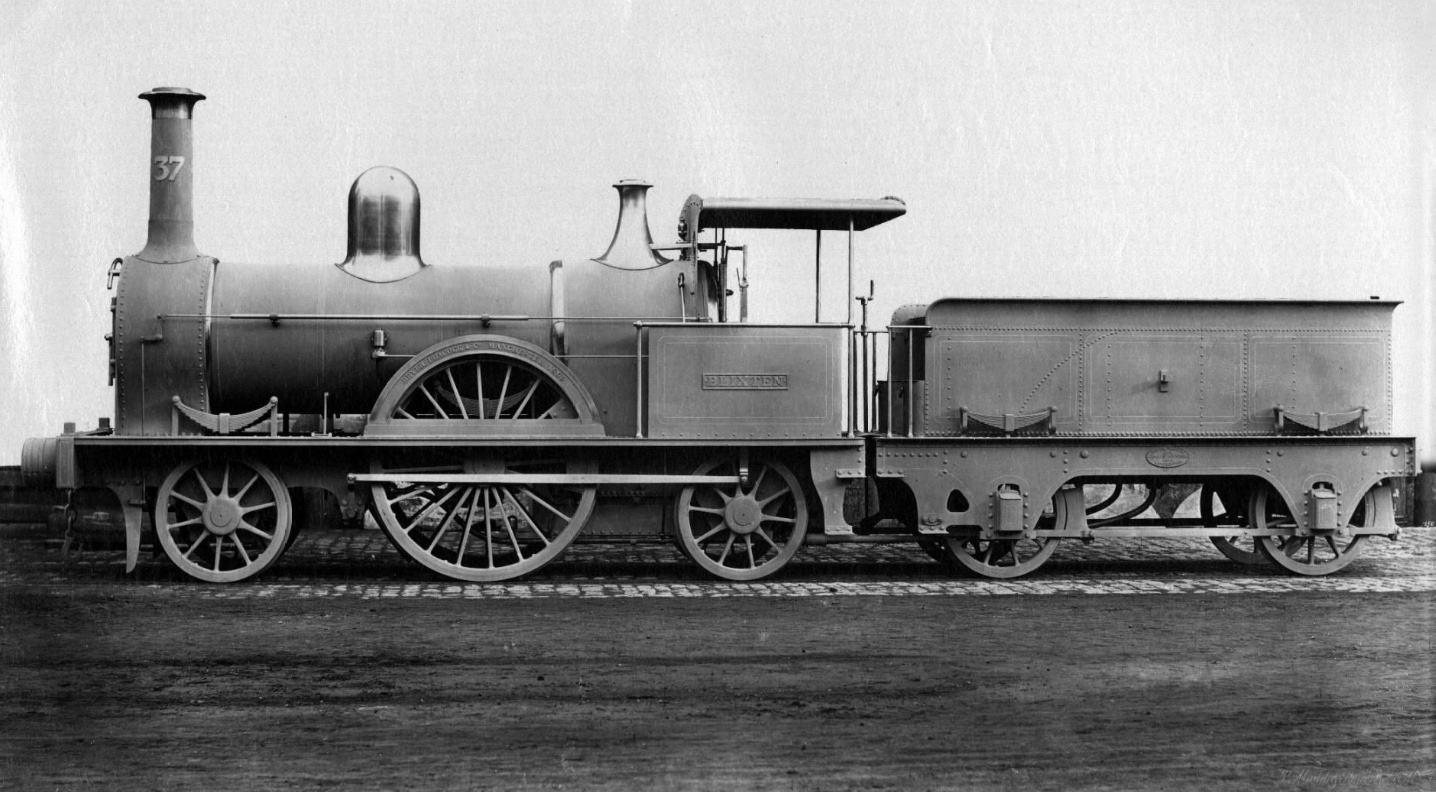
Type and origin
- Power type: Steam
- Builder: Beyer, Peacock & Company
- Build date: 1863, 1866
- Total produced: 10
Specifications
- Configuration
  - Whyte: 2-2-2, later: 0-4-2
  - UIC: 1A1, later: B1
- Gauge: 1,435 mm (4 ft 8 1/2 in)
- Leading dia.: 1'A1' 1,067 mm (3 ft 6.0 in), B1' 1,092 mm (3 ft 7.0 in)
- Driver dia.: 1'A1' 1,880 mm (6 ft 2 in), B1' 1,175 mm (3 ft 10.3 in)
- Tender wheels: 1'A1' 1,067 mm (3 ft 6.0 in), B1' 1,092 mm (3 ft 7.0 in)
- Length: 1'A1' 12,174 mm (39 ft 11.3 in), B1' 13,154 mm (43 ft 1.9 in)
- Height: 1'A1' 4,013 mm (13 ft 2.0 in), B1' 4,025 mm (13 ft 2.5 in)
- Loco weight: 1'A1' 23.8 t (26.2 short tons; 23.4 long tons), B1' 26.4 t (29.1 short tons; 26.0 long tons)
- Tender weight: 1'A1' 17.5 t (19.3 short tons; 17.2 long tons), B1' 20.6 t (22.7 short tons; 20.3 long tons)
- Fuel type: Coal
- Fuel capacity: 4 wheeled tender: 3 t (3.3 short tons; 3.0 long tons), 6 wheeled tender: 3.5 t (3.9 short tons; 3.4 long tons)
- Water cap.: 4 wheeled tender: 5.6 m^{3} (1,200 imp gal), 6 wheeled tender: 6.6 m^{3} (1,500 imp gal)
- Firebox
  - Grate area: 1.31 m^{2} (14.1 sq ft)
- Boiler pressure: Small boiler: 6.2 bar (90 psi), Large boiler: 8.3 bar (120 psi)
- Heating surface
  - Firebox: 7 m^{2} (75 sq ft)
  - Tubes: 66 m^{2} (710 sq ft)
- Cylinders: 2
- Cylinder size: 381 mm × 508 mm (15.0 in × 20.0 in)
- Valve gear: Allan
- Loco brake: Handbrake, Vacuum Brake and steambrake
Performance figures
- Tractive effort: 1'A1': 21.57 kN (4,850 lbf)
Career
- Operators: NS
- Power class: NS: R
- Number in class: SS: 1-4, 79-84, 131-140, 251-260; NS: 501, 601-606
- Nicknames: Kleine Engelsman (Little Englishman)
- Withdrawn: 1911-1913, 1921-1923
- Disposition: All scrapped

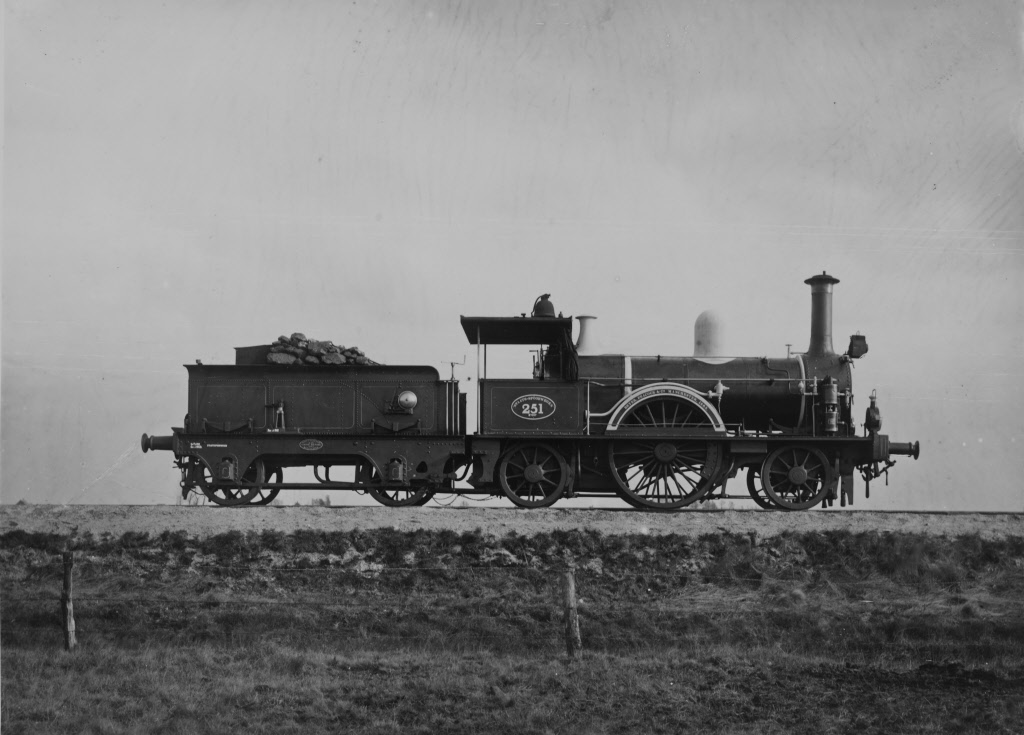
The S.S. 251 between 1910 and 1913.

The NS 600 was a series of steam locomotives of the Nederlandse Spoorwegen (NS) and its predecessor Maatschappij tot Exploitatie van Staatsspoorwegen (SS).

For the operation of the railway lines Breda - Tilburg (opened on October 5 1863) and Harlingen - Leeuwarden (opened on October 27 1863), the SS ordered four steam locomotives with the wheel arrangement 1'A1' (2-2-2) from Beyer, Peacock & Company of Manchester, England. No. 1 and 2 were put into service in the south between Breda and Tilburg, No. 3 and 4 in the north. The locomotives were equipped with a boiler with a maximum working pressure of 6.2 kg/cm^{2} (88 psi). With the expansion of both railway lines, another 6 locomotives were ordered in 1866, which were given the numbers SS No. 79-84. These locomotives were fitted with a boiler with a maximum working pressure of 8.3 kg/cm^{2} (118 psi). In 1872 the series was renumbered as the continuous series 131–140. In 1876 another renumbering followed, this time in 251–260.

In the 1880s, these locomotives became less and less suitable for the heavier passenger trains. In 1882 six locomotives (Nos. 252, 253, 255, 256, 257 and 258) were rebuilt, with the front axle and the large driving wheel being replaced by two small driven axles. No. 252 acquired the larger boiler of No. 259 for which both locomotives were also renumbered. The same happened with Nos. 253 and 260. This also created two consecutive number series: Nos. 251–254 with a small boiler and still the wheel arrangement 1A1; and the Nos. 255–260 with a large boiler and the wheel arrangement B1. In 1891, No. 253 received a new boiler with a maximum working pressure of 8.3 kg/cm^{2} (118 psi), followed by No. 254 and 1892 and Nos. 251 and 252 in 1894. Between 1911 and 1915, Nos. 255-260 received new boilers, with the maximum working pressure remaining the same. In 1893, the factory numbers of Nos. 251 and 260 were swapped.

No. 253 was the first to be withdrawn in 1911, followed by Nos. 251 and 253 in 1913. When the fleets of the HSM and the SS was merged into the Dutch Railways in 1921, the only remaining locomotive with the wheel arrangement 1'A1' was given the NS number 501 and the locomotives with two driven axles converted to wheel arrangement B1', the NS numbers 601–606. Whether the 501 actually carried this number is uncertain, as the locomotive was not used since April 1921 and the physical renumbering took place in December. No. 501 is the only steam locomotive with only one driven axle that has survived into the NS era. No. 604 was withdrawn in 1922, the others followed in 1923.

== Overview ==
Factory number	Built date	SS number	SS number 1872	SS number 1876	Rebuild into a B1 in 1882	SS number 1886	NS number	Withdrawn	Notes
387/385	1863	1	131	251	No			1913	In 1893, the factory numbers of 385 and 387 were swapped
386	1863	2	132	252	Yes	259	605	1923	
385/387	1863	3	133	253	Yes	260	606	1923	In 1893, the factory numbers of 385 and 387 were swapped
388	1863	4	134	254	No			1913	
688	1866	79	135	255	Yes		601	1923	
689	1866	80	136	256	Yes		602	1923	
690	1866	81	137	257	Yes		603	1923	
691	1866	82	138	258	Yes		604	1922	
692	1866	83	139	259	No	252	501	1921	
693	1866	84	140	260	No	253		1911	

== Sources and references ==
- R.C. Statius Muller, A.J. Veenendaal jr., H. Waldorp: De Nederlandse stoomlocomotieven. Uitg. De Alk, Alkmaar, 2005. ISBN 978-90-6013-262-3.
- Het Utrechts Archief
