= NS 5000 (1877) =

Netherlands 2-4-0T locomotives

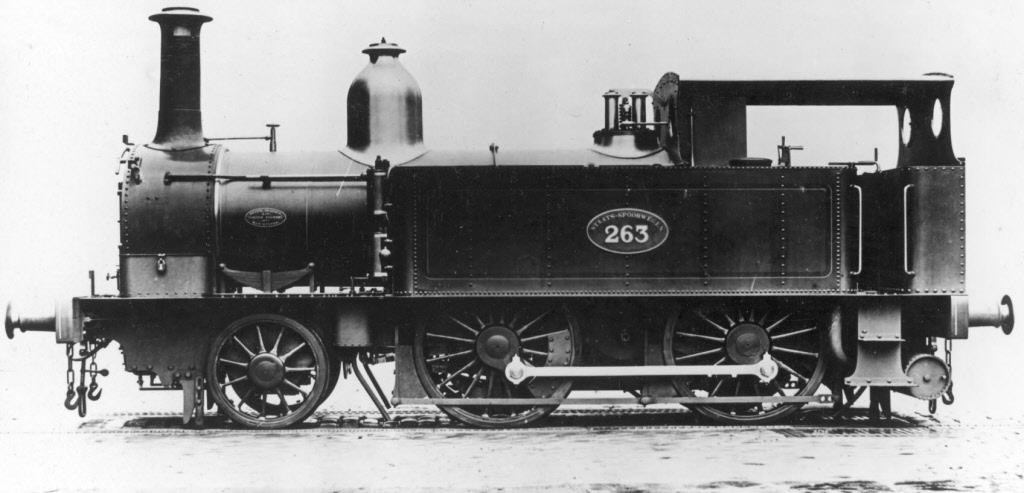
Type and origin
- Power type: Steam
- Builder: Beyer, Peacock & Company
- Build date: 1877-1878
- Total produced: 6
Specifications
- Configuration
  - Whyte: 2-4-0
  - UIC: 1'B
- Gauge: 1,435 mm (4 ft 8 1/2 in)
- Leading dia.: 1,092 mm (3 ft 7.0 in)
- Driver dia.: 1,524 mm (5 ft 0 in)
- Length: 8,976 mm (29 ft 5.4 in)
- Height: 4,013 mm (13 ft 2.0 in)
- Loco weight: 40.3 t (44.4 short tons; 39.7 long tons)
- Fuel type: Coal
- Fuel capacity: 1 t (1.1 short tons; 0.98 long tons)
- Water cap.: 4.5 m^{3} (990 imp gal)
- Firebox
  - Grate area: 1.35 m^{2} (14.5 sq ft)
- Boiler pressure: 9.3 bar (135 psi)
- Heating surface
  - Firebox: 7 m^{2} (75 sq ft)
  - Tubes: 68 m^{2} (730 sq ft)
- Cylinders: 2
- Cylinder size: 406 mm × 610 mm (16.0 in × 24.0 in)
- Valve gear: Stephenson
Performance figures
- Maximum speed: 75 km/h (47 mph)
Career
- Operators: SS: 685-778, 785-799; NS: 3701-3820
- Power class: NS: PT^{1}
- Numbers: SS: 261-266; NS: 5001-5006
- Withdrawn: 1927-1935
- Disposition: All scrapped

The NS 5000 was a series of tank engines of Nederlandse Spoorwegen (NS) and its predecessor Maatschappij tot Exploitatie van Staatsspoorwegen (SS).

The SS ordered six tank engines for shunting work manufactured by Beyer, Peacock & Company in Manchester, England. They were delivered in 1877 and 1878 with numbers 261–266. Later, the locomotives were used more and more for passenger services. Originally the cab was open, but at the start of World War I the cab was provided with lockable windows.

When the fleets of the HSM and the SS was merged into Nederlandse Spoorwegen in 1921, the locomotives were given the NS numbers 5001–5006. The locomotives were withdrawn between 1927 and 1935. No engines have been preserved.

Factory number	Date built	SS number	NS number	Withdrawn	Notes
1694	1877	261	5001	1929	
1695	1877	262	5002	1927	
1696	1877	263	5003	1935	
1697	1877	264	5004	1929	
1746	1878	265	5005	1932	
1747	1878	266	5006	1935	

== Sources and references ==
- Waldorp, H. (1981). Onze Nederlandse stoomlocomotieven in woord en beeld. Alkmaar: De Alk. pp. 21–22. ISBN 90-6013-909-7.
- R.C. Statius Muller, A.J. Veenendaal jr., H. Waldorp (2005). De Nederlandse stoomlocomotieven. Alkmaar: De Alk. ISBN 9060132629.
- Weijts, A. (2001). Tussen vuur en stoom. Zaltbommel: Europese Bibliotheek. ISBN 9028826947.
- "Het Utrechts archief".
