= NS 5300 =

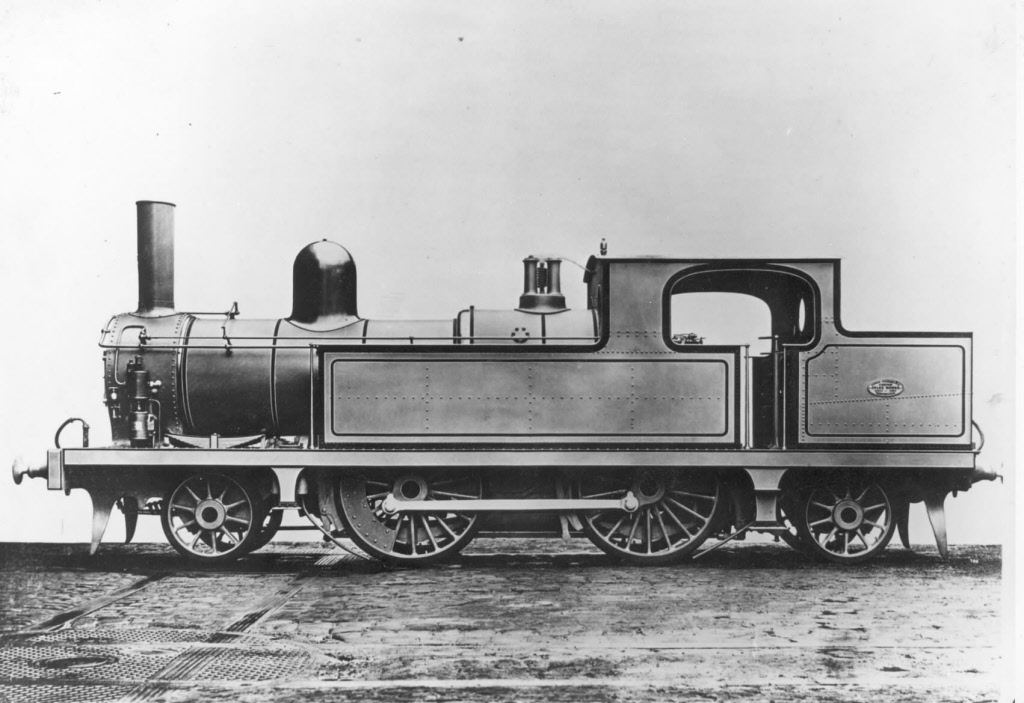
Type and origin
- Power type: Steam
- Builder: Sharp, Stewart & Co. Ltd., Atlas Works, Manchester
- Serial number: 2928–2931, 2951–2956, 3042, 3043
- Model: NRS 284–287
- Build date: 1880 to 1882
- Total produced: 12
Specifications
- Configuration
  - Whyte: 2-4-2
  - AAR: 1-B-1
  - UIC: 1B1
- Gauge: 1,435 mm (4 ft 8 1/2 in)
- Leading dia.: 1,054 mm
- Driver dia.: 1,700 mm
- Coupled dia.: 1,700 mm
- Trailing dia.: 1,054 mm
- Length
  - Over beams: 10,946 mm
- Height: 4,115 mm
- Loco weight: 52.9 tonnes
- Fuel type: Coal
- Fuel capacity: 2 tonnes
- Water cap.: 6,400 l
- Firebox
  - Grate area: 1.59 m ^{2}
- Boiler pressure: 0,3 kg/cm^{2}
- Heating surface
  - Firebox: 9.5 m^{2}
  - Tubes: 85 m^{2}
- Cylinders: 2, inside
- Cylinder size: 445 x 559 mm
- Valve type: Stephenson
- Loco brake: Westinghouse
- Safety systems: Yes, except NZOS machines
Performance figures
- Maximum speed: 80 km/h
- Tractive effort: 4,700 kg
Career
- Operators: NRS, SS, HSM, NZOS and NS
- Numbers: NRS: 284–286; NZOS: 1–8; SS: 267–274, 1285, 1287; HSM: 309–310; NS: 5301–5310
- Retired: 1925–1935
- Current owner: None
- Disposition: All scrapped

The NS 5300 class were a class of 2-4-2 tank engines built between 1880 and 1882 for passenger services, in fact, they were most likely the first tank engines in The Netherlands with that wheel arrangement. The Westinghouse brake system was a first for the NRS; the additional hand brake was common. To obtain a stable ride at high speeds, inside cylinders were employed. The firebox was situated between the coupled axles. The front and rear axles were of the Webb type, already employed by the London North Western Railway. The radial axle boxes were produced with very fine tolerances. Rubber bumpers were employed to move the axle back into position.

Locomotives Nos. 285 and 287 transferred to the SS, while locomotives 284 and 286 were transferred to the HSM at the termination of the NRS. Both HSM locomotives were sold before the merger of HSM and SS to NS. HSM 310 (old 386) was sold to Spoorweg-Maatschappij Gent-Terneuzen, where it remained in service until 1915. HSM 309 (former 384) was sold to the Amsterdamse Ballast Maatschappij in 1918, where it remained in service until 1930. Units 285 and 287 were renumbered 1285 and 1287 by the SS.

A second series of the same type of locomotives was ordered by the Nederlandsche Zuid Ooster Spoorweg Maatschappij (NOZS). Initially, six engines were ordered for service on its Nijmegen-Den Bosch-Tilburg route; later another two machines were added. These machines did not have the safety valve that was present on the NRS machines. These machines entered service in 1882 and 1883. At the merger of the SS, into which the NZOS had been merged, into the NS, these machines were employed by the NS to run local trains, together with the two units transferred via the SS. The SS numbers were 267–274.

During their later operating years, some engines got outfitted with serve-pipes which put the heated surface to 107.5 m^{2} or 89.5 m^{2}.

The NS renumbered the units 5301–5310 at the merger of SS and HSM in 1921. The former NZOS locomotives were numbered 5301–5308, whilst the NRS units were numbered 5309 and 5310. They were classified as PT^{3} by NS. The locomotives were retired between 1925 and 1935. All have been scrapped.

== Overview ==
Builder Number	NRS Number	NZOS Number	HSM Number	SS Number	NS Number	Entered service	Retired	Details
2928	284		309			1880	1930	In 1918 sold to Amsterdamse Ballast Maatschappij.
2929	285			1285	5309	1880	1933	
2930	286		310			1880	1915	In 1905 sold to Spoorweg-Maatschappij Gent-Terneuzen
2931	287			1287	5310	1880	1935	
2951		1		267	5301	1881	1930	
2952		2		268	5302	1881	1925	
2953		3		269	5303	1881	1932	
2954		4		270	5304	1881	1930	
2955		5		271	5305	1881	1925	
2956		6		272	5306	1881	1934	
3042		7		273	5307	1882	1925	
3043		8		274	5308	1882	1934	
