= Nederlandsche Centraal-Spoorweg-Maatschappij =

Nederlandsche Centraal-Spoorweg-Maatschappij (NCS)
Overview
- Headquarters: Utrecht
- Locale: The Netherlands
- Dates of operation: 1860–1919
- Successor: NS

Technical
- Track gauge: 1,435 mm (4 ft 8 1/2 in)

The Nederlandsche Centraal-Spoorweg-Maatschappij (Dutch Central Railway Company, NCS) was founded on 20 February 1860 in Amsterdam and established in Utrecht from 1876 and was dissolved on 23 May 1934. The Central Railway Utrecht–Amersfoort–Zwolle–Kampen was constructed by the NCS.

== History ==
The Utrecht–Amersfoort–Hattem line section was opened on 16 July 1863. Hattem–Zwolle, with the crossing of the IJssel, followed on 6 June 1864. The Kamperlijntje (Zwolle–Kampen) was closed after delay due to the flooding of the Mastenbroekerpolder on 10 May. Officially opened in 1865.

The NCS also opened a number of branchlines railways in the province of Utrecht, Den Dolder–Baarn on 27 June 1898 and Bilthoven–Zeist on 29 August 1901. The starting point for the branchline trains was Utrecht from 1904 the Buurtstation, just north of the main station of the NRS and separated from it by the Leidse Vaart. The renovation of Utrecht Central Station in 1936, made this station had which 4 lines redundant. The tracks of the neighborhood station were extended to Central Station. Until the 1980s, the lines ' 1 to 4 remained recognizable as separate ends within Central Station.

The local railway line Ede–Barneveld–Nijkerk was also operated by the NCS from 1902 to 1903.

The NCS also operated a number of steam tramways: Nunspeet – Hattemerbroek (the Zuiderzeetramweg, opened 1908–1914; owned by NBM) and Zwolle–Zwartsluis–Blokzijl (opened 1914; owned by ZB (transferred to NWH) and the electric tram line Utrecht–Zeist (owned by NBM) .

In 1885 the Nederlandsche Rhijnspoorweg-Maatschappij (NRS) acquired the majority of the shares of the NCS and 1890 the NRS was taken over by the State of the Netherlands. In 1919, the operation of the NCS was continued by the State Railways, which had entered into an agreement of interests with the HIJSM in 1917. The NCS eventually became a part of the Dutch Railways (NS) in 1934.

== Sources ==
- Nico Spilt
- Het Urechts Archief
