= Hollandsche IJzeren Spoorweg-Maatschappij =

Hollandse IJzeren Spoorweg-Maatschappij
- Industry: Rail Transport
- Founded: 1837
- Defunct: 1938
- Fate: Merged with the Maatschappij tot Exploitatie van Staatsspoorwegen
- Successor: Nederlandse Spoorwegen
- Headquarters: Amsterdam, Netherlands

Hollandsche IJzeren Spoorweg-Maatschappij
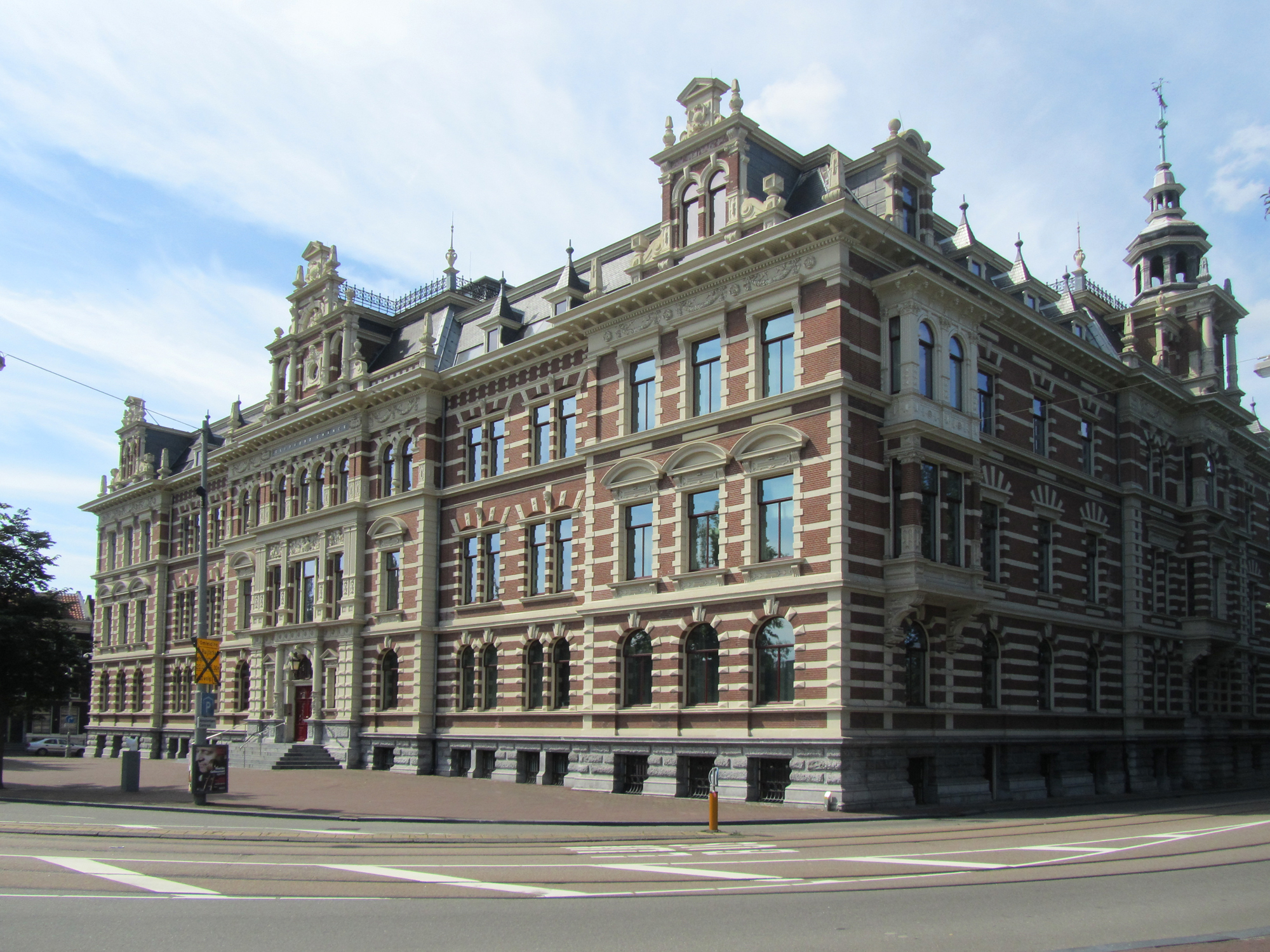
- Former headquarters of the HSM, built across the street from their main station in Amsterdam.

Overview
- Headquarters: Amsterdam
- Locale: Netherlands
- Dates of operation: 1839–1938
- Successor: Nederlandse Spoorwegen

Technical
- Track gauge: 1,435 mm (4 ft 8 1/2 in) standard gauge
- Previous gauge: 1,945 mm (6 ft 4 9/16 in) until 1866

The Hollandsche IJzeren Spoorweg-Maatschappij (Dutch pronunciation: [ˈɦɔlɑntsə ˈɛizərə(n) ˈspoːrʋɛxmaːtsxɑˌpɛi]) or HSM (Holland Iron Railway Company) was the first railway company in the Netherlands founded on 8 August 1837 as a private company, starting operation in 1839 with a line between Amsterdam and Haarlem. The company remained operational until 1938, when it merged with the Maatschappij tot Exploitatie van Staatsspoorwegen (SS) to form the Nederlandse Spoorwegen (NS).

== History ==
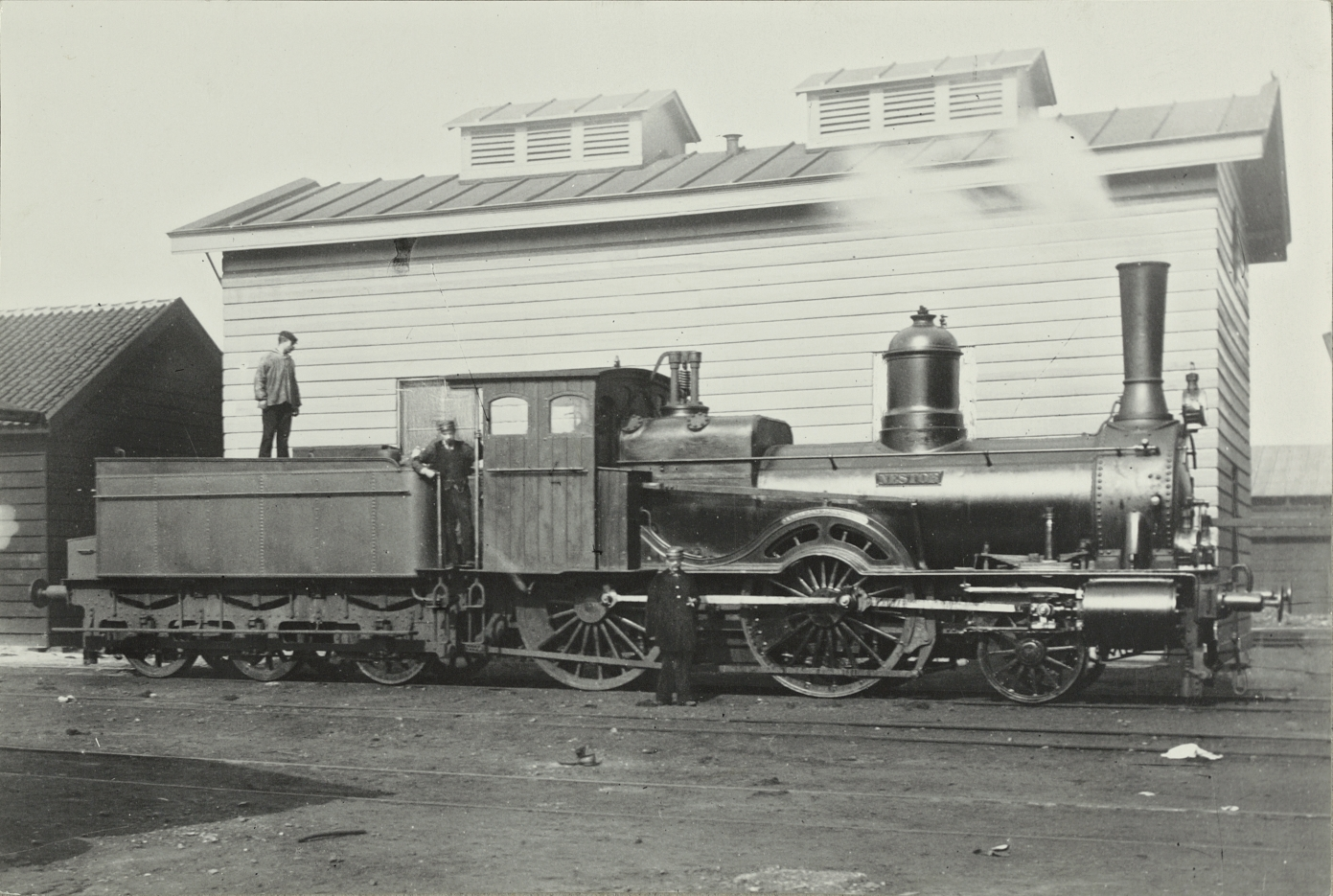
Steam locomotive HSM 89 Nestor acquired from A. Borsig in 1880 and used for express passenger service.

The first line constructed was a line following the straight route of the Haarlemmertrekvaart canal, connecting Amsterdam with Haarlem, which opened on 20 September 1839. The line was quickly expanded to follow the Leidsevaart canal and reached Leiden in 1842, The Hague in 1843, and Rotterdam in 1847. Because this line is the oldest line in the Netherlands, it is now known as the Old Line. This line was originally built to Dutch broad gauge 1,945 mm (6 ft 4 9/16 in), but was converted to 1,435 mm (4 ft 8 1/2 in) standard gauge in 1866.

The line started at the Amsterdam d'Eenhonderd Roe station on the west side of Amsterdam, across the street from the company's headquarters, and ran to the Delftse Poort station in Rotterdam. Aside from this line, the HSM constructed a number of other rail- and tramways in the Netherlands, mainly in the relatively densely populated Holland, such as the Staatslijn K (1860–1865), a line northwards from Haarlem to Uitgeest in 1867, and the line to Zandvoort (1881). But the HSM also exploited lines to other regions, such as Utrecht (where it connected to lines of the SS), Zutphen (past cities as Amersfoort and Apeldoorn) and Nijmegen. The HSM even exploited a line to Leeuwarden, which took passengers by boat over the Zuiderzee.

== School ==
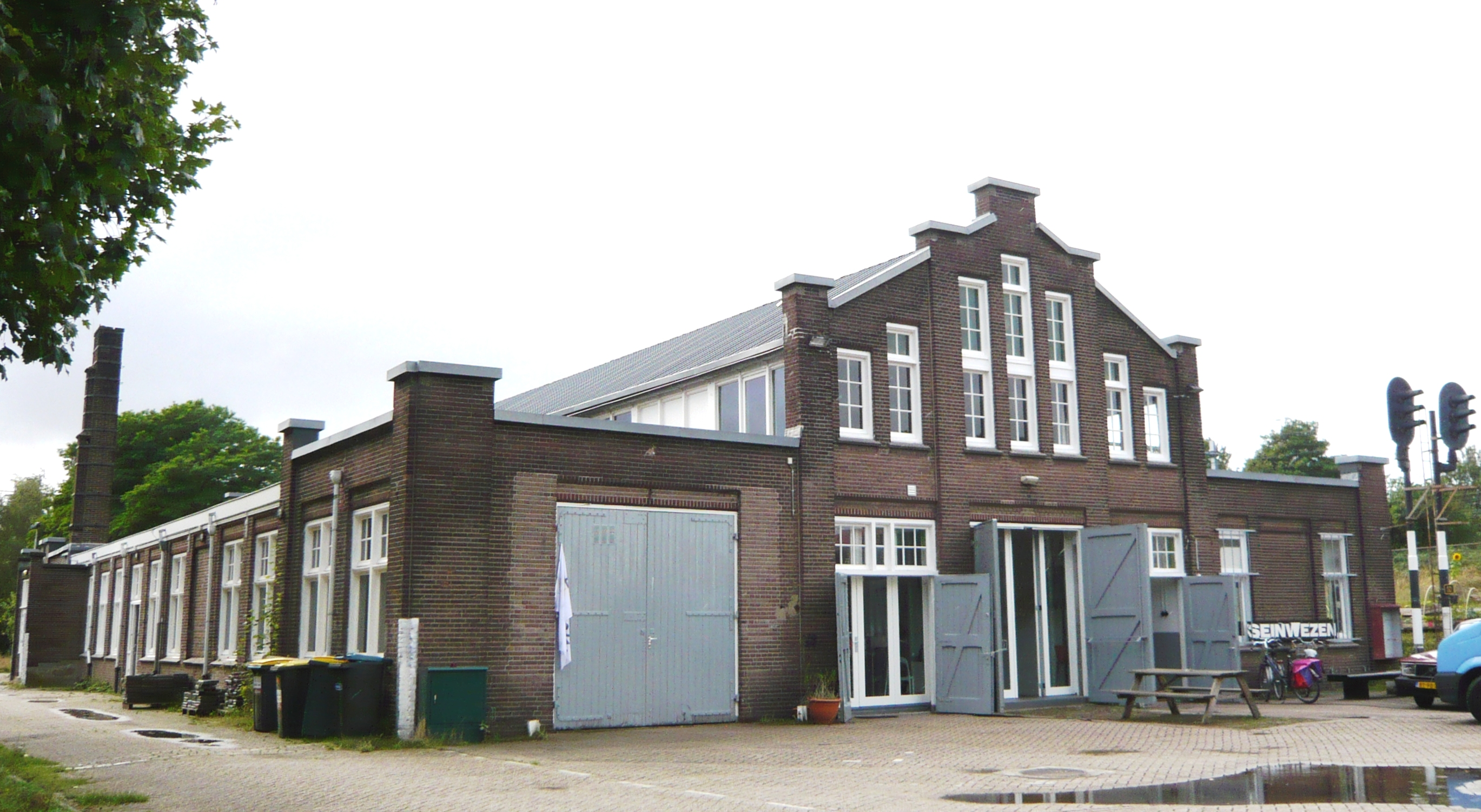
The former main offices of Seinwezen, the division in charge of signage for the railways, was located in Haarlem.

To service the trains on the rails, the HSM had the services of Koninklijke Fabriek van Rijtuigen en Spoorwagens J.J. Beijnes in Haarlem. This company grew so fast, that in 1891, the HSM, aided by the social activist Daniel de Clercq, began the Haarlem society called De Ambachtsschool to unify various city efforts to start a vocational school in Haarlem, in order to satisfy their need for workers in the booming train business.

== Merger ==
Economic woes caused by the First World War forced the HSM to start cooperation with the other Dutch railway company Maatschappij tot Exploitatie van Staatsspoorwegen (SS) to strengthen their economic position. In 1938, this led to the formation of the Nederlandse Spoorwegen.

== See also ==
- De Arend (locomotive)
