= Maatschappij tot Exploitatie van Staatsspoorwegen =

- Industry: Rail Transport
- Founded: 1863
- Defunct: 1938
- Fate: Merged with the Hollandsche IJzeren Spoorweg-Maatschappij
- Successor: Nederlandse Spoorwegen
- Headquarters: Utrecht, Netherlands

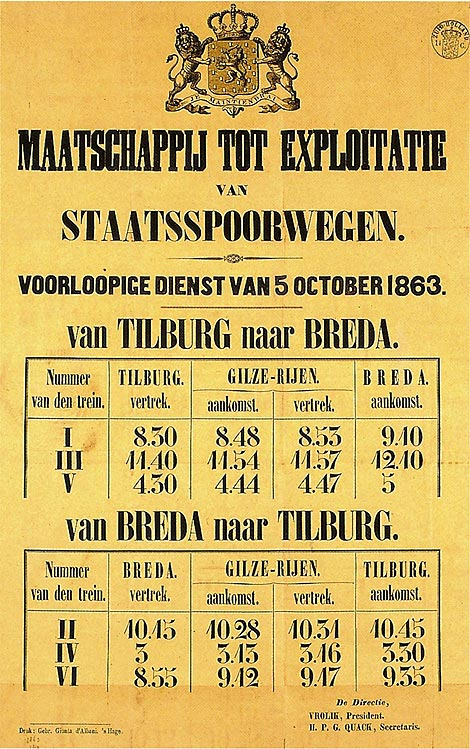
Local timetable

The Maatschappij tot Exploitatie van Staatsspoorwegen (Dutch pronunciation: [maːtsxɑˈpɛi tɔt ɛksplʋaˈtaːtsi vɑn ˈstaːtspoːrˌʋeːɣə(n)]; "Company for the Exploitation of the State Railways") or SS was a private railroad founded to use the government funded railways. The company existed until 1938, when it formally merged with the Hollandsche IJzeren Spoorweg-Maatschappij (HSM) to form the Nederlandse Spoorwegen. The SS was, along with the HSM, the largest railroad company in the Netherlands.

In the 19th century, the government constructed a number of state railroads, the staatslijnen, to (major) cities and regions not yet served by the other railroads, but for which it was deemed important to connect them to the country's rail network. These lines were primarily located outside of the relatively densely populated Holland region, where the HSM ran services on the main lines. The SS was then founded as a private company to use these lines.

In 1890 the SS began to use the lines previously run by the defunct Nederlandsche Rhijnspoorweg-Maatschappij, and in 1919 it also began to use lines run by the Nederlandsche Centraal-Spoorweg-Maatschappij.

The company was formally merged with the HSM to form the Nederlandse Spoorwegen in 1938, although independent operations had stopped earlier.
