= NS 1900 =

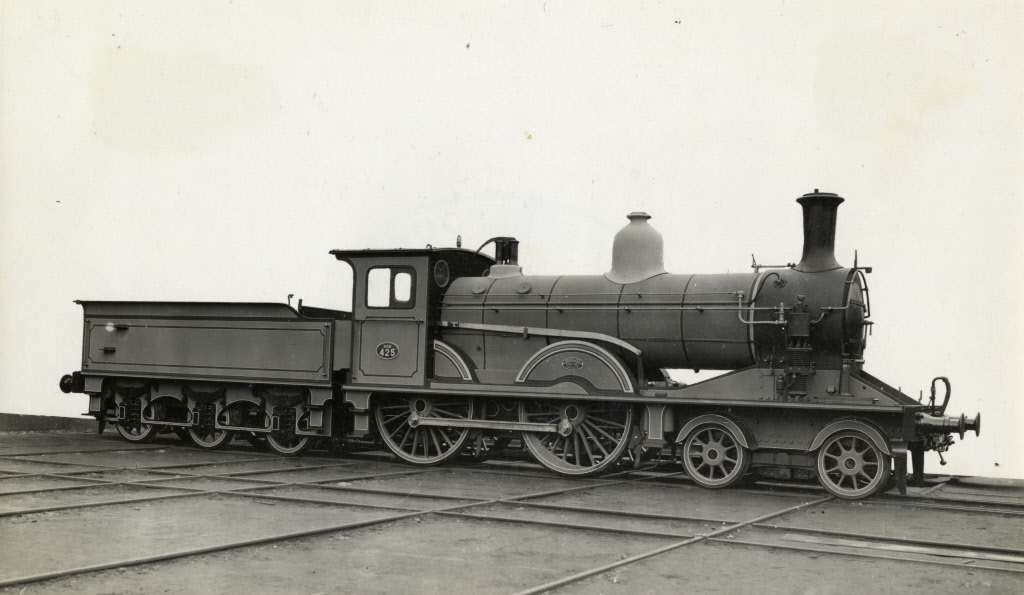
Type and origin
- Power type: Steam
- Builder: Werkspoor
- Build date: 1907-1913
- Total produced: 40
Specifications
- Configuration
  - Whyte: 4-4-0
  - UIC: 2'B
- Leading dia.: 991 mm (3 ft 3.0 in)
- Driver dia.: 2,016 mm (6 ft 7.4 in)
- Tender wheels: 1,105 mm (3 ft 7.5 in)
- Length
  - Over beams: 16,978 mm (55 ft 8.4 in); 1913-1914: 16,951 mm (55 ft 7.4 in)
- Height: 4,365 mm (14 ft 3.9 in)
- Loco weight: 52.2 t (57.5 short tons; 51.4 long tons)
- Tender weight: 39.2 t (43.2 short tons; 38.6 long tons)
- Fuel type: Coal
- Fuel capacity: 4 t (4.4 short tons; 3.9 long tons)
- Water cap.: 17 m^{3} (3,700 imp gal)
- Firebox
  - Grate area: 2.04 m^{2} (22.0 sq ft)
- Boiler pressure: 10.5 bar (152 psi) superheated
- Heating surface
  - Firebox: 10 m^{2} (110 sq ft)
  - Tubes: 71 m^{2} (760 sq ft)
- Superheater
  - Heating area: 23 m^{2} (250 sq ft)
- Cylinders: 2
- Cylinder size: 500 mm × 660 mm (20 in × 26 in)
- Valve gear: Stephenson
Performance figures
- Maximum speed: 100 km/h (62 mph)
- Tractive effort: 59.23 kN (13,320 lbf)
Career
- Operators: SS, NS
- Power class: HSM: PV^{1}, NS: PO^{1}
- Numbers: HSM: 421-460, NS: 1901-1940
- Withdrawn: 1946-1948
- Disposition: All scrapped

The NS 1900 was a series of express train steam locomotives of the Dutch Railways (NS) and its predecessor Hollandsche IJzeren Spoorweg-Maatschappij (HSM).

After the first tank locomotives 771-772 (NS 5700) with superheater, the HSM ordered other locomotives with a superheater. Like the 771–772, these were built by Werkspoor in 1907. The HSM gave them numbers 421–425. In a way, these locomotives can be regarded as a further development of the 350-408 (NS 1600) with a superheater. After good experiences, including a coal saving of 15 to 17%, another order was places for a further 34 locomotives which were between 1908 and 1913.

When the locomotives and rolling stock fleets of the HSM and the Maatschappij tot Exploitatie van Staatsspoorwegen was merged in 1921, the locomotives of this series were given the NS numbers 1901–1940. During the Second World War, a number of locomotives were taken eastward, No's 1908, 1934, 1935 and 1937 never returned and were reported missing. The rest were disposed of between 1946 and 1948. No locomotive has been preserved.

Lot no.	Built	HSM numbers	NS numbers	Withdrawn	notes
183-187	1907	421-425	1901-1905	1946-1948	
227-229	1908	426-428	1906-1908	1946-1948	NS 1906 Missing after world war II
230-233	1909	429-432	1909-1912	1946-1948	
238-244	1909	433-439	1913-1919	1946-1947	
245-247	1910	440-442	1920-1922	1946	
266-270	1911	443-447	1923-1927	1946-1947	
289-295	1912	448-454	1928-1934	1946-1948	NS 1934 Missing after world war II
322-327	1913	455-460	1935-1940	1946-1947	NS 1935 and 1937 Missing after world war II

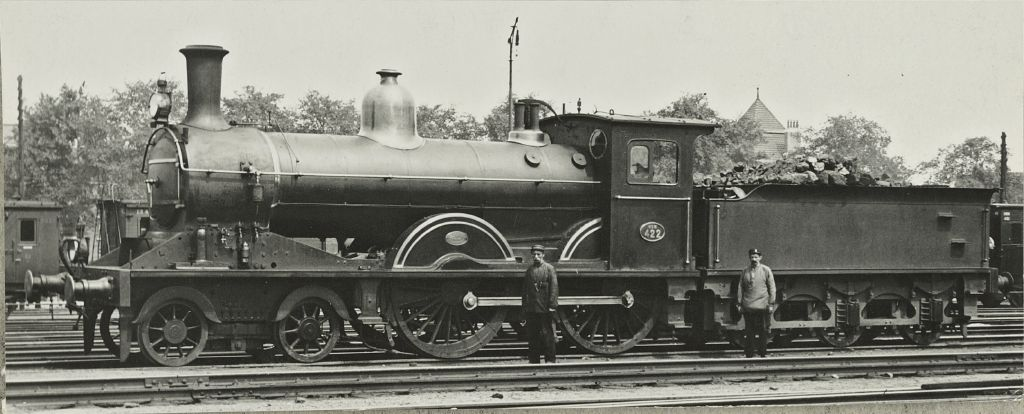
NS 1902 - HSM 422 (ca. 1910)

== Sources and references ==
- R.C. Statius Muller, A.J. Veenendaal jr., H. Waldorp: De Nederlandse stoomlocomotieven. Uitg. De Alk, Alkmaar, 2005. ISBN 90-6013-262-9.
- J. van der Meer: De Hollandsche IJzeren Spoorweg-Maatschappij. Uitg. Uquilair, 2009, ISBN 978-90-71513-68-8.
- J.J. Karskens: De Locomotieven van de Hollandsche IJzeren Spoorweg Maatschappij. Uitg. J.H. Gottmer, Haarlem - Antwerpen, 1947.
- M.A. Asselberghs: Nederlands Spoorwegmuseum. Een wandeling langs de verzameling. Uitg. Nederlands Spoorwegmuseum, Utrecht, 1987.
