= NS 1600 (steam locomotive) =

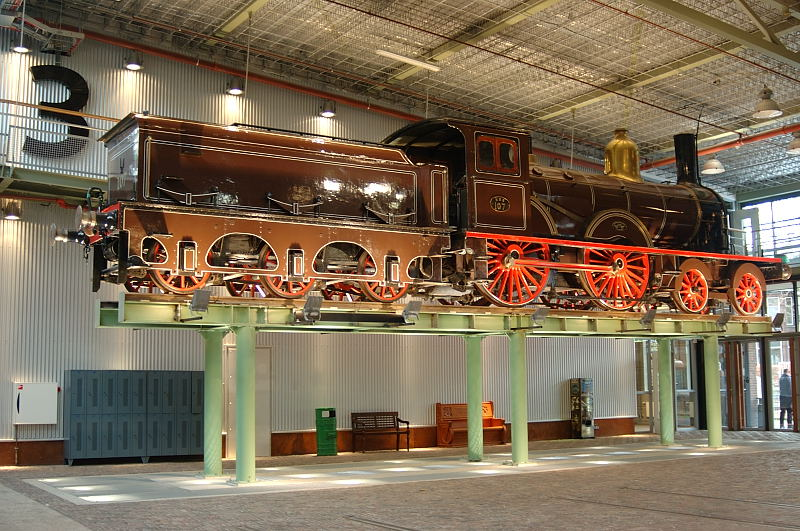
- NRS 107 in het Nederlands Spoorwegmuseum in Utrecht
Type and origin
- Power type: Steam
- Builder: Sharp Stewart and Company, North British Locomotive Company
- Serial number: Sharp, Roberts and Company: 350-3563, 3557-3559, 3565, 3740-3759, 3814-3833, 4620-4624; North British Locomotive Company: 15898-15902.
- Model: NRS 101-109
- Build date: 1889-1903
- Total produced: 59
Specifications
- Configuration
  - Whyte: 4-4-0
  - AAR: 2-B
  - UIC: 2'B
- Gauge: 1,435 mm (4 ft 8 1/2 in)
- Trucks: leading
- Bogies: leading
- Leading dia.: 1,105 mm (3 ft 7.5 in)
- Driver dia.: 2,016 mm (6 ft 7.4 in)
- Tender wheels: 1,105 mm (3 ft 7.5 in)
- Length
  - Over beams: NRS 101 - 109: 16,585 mm (54.413 ft); Remainder: 16,746 mm (54 ft 11.3 in)
- Width: 2,222 mm (7 ft 3.5 in)
- Height: 4,267 mm (14 ft 0 in)
- Loco weight: 101-109: 48.0 t (47.2 long tons; 52.9 short tons); Remainder: 50 t (49 long tons; 55 short tons)
- Tender weight: 32.5 t (32.0 long tons; 35.8 short tons)
- Fuel type: Coal
- Fuel capacity: 3 t (3.0 long tons; 3.3 short tons)
- Water cap.: 12,700 L (2,800 imp gal; 3,400 US gal)
- Boiler pressure: 10.3 kg/cm^{2} (1,010 kPa; 147 psi)
- Feedwater heater: Knorr
- Heating surface
  - Firebox: 101-109: 10 m^{2} (110 sq ft); Remainder: 9.5 m^{2} (102 sq ft)
  - Total surface: 101-109: 103 m^{2} (1,110 sq ft); Remainder: 93.5 m^{2} (1,006 sq ft)
- Cylinders: 2, inside
- Cylinder size: 457 mm × 660 mm (18.0 in × 26.0 in)
- Valve type: Stephenson
- Train heating: Yes, originally only rear working, from 1932 also front working
Performance figures
- Maximum speed: 90 km/h (56 mph); Superheated: 100 km/h (62 mph)
Career
- Operators: NRS, HSM, SS, NCS, NS
- Numbers: NRS: 101-109, SS: 1101-1103, 1108-1109, HSM: 350-408, NS: 1601-1659
- Nicknames: Rhijnbogen
- Locale: The Netherlands
- Delivered: 1889-1903
- First run: NRS 101-109: 1889, HSM 350-357: 1891, HSM 358-389: 1892, HSM 390-408: 1900, NS 1655-1659: 1903
- Preserved: NRS 107
- Current owner: Nederlands Spoorwegmuseum

The NS 1600 was a series of steam engines of the Dutch national railways, Nederlandse Spoorwegen (NS), and its predecessors Maatschappij tot Exploitatie van Staatsspoorwegen (SS), Hollandsche IJzeren Spoorweg-Maatschappij (HSM) and Nederlandsche Rhijnspoorweg-Maatschappij (NRS).

Two locomotives of this series were involved in the train disaster at Twello (The Netherlands) in 1900.

== NRS 101-109 (HSM 350-358, NS 1601-1609) ==
The Nederlandsche Rhijnspoorweg-Maatschappij (NRS) ordered nine locomotives numbered 101–109 at Sharp, Stewart and Company located in Glasgow in 1899. The axle configuration of these locomotives was 2'B. These were the first locomotives in The Netherlands with a bogie in front of the driving wheels. Originally these locomotives were equipped with a speedometer of the system Kapteyn, which was driven by one of the axles of the bogie. A sanding system of Gresham & Craven was fitted as well.

A year after the order of these locomotives, the NRS was disbanded and these were its last locomotives ordered. The equipment of the disbanded railroad was split over Hollandsche IJzeren Spoorweg-Maatschappij (HSM) and Maatschappij tot Exploitatie van Staatsspoorwegen (SS); each railroad receiving the same number of locomotives randomly being assigned. Locomotives 101, 102, 103, 108 and 109 transferred to the SS and were renumbered in SS numbers 1101-1103 and 1108–1109. Locomotives 104-107 transferred to HSM and were renumbered HSM 350–353. As the locomotives were too long for the small SS turntables, the SS transferred them in 1891 to the HSM, where they were renumbered 354–358. They were nicknamed "Rhijnbogen" at the HSM in honour of their NRS heritage and their bogies.

At the merger of the equipment of HSM and SS in 1921, the locomotives were numbered in the NS 1601–1609. The locomotives were taken out of service between 1935 and 1938, with the exception of 1604. This locomotive continued in service until 1940. Locomotive 1604 was chosen for inclusion in the collection of the Dutch Railway Museum (Nederlands Spoorwegmuseum). To this purpose it was stored in the locomotive facility in Maastricht. On 8 September 1944 the locomotive was severely damaged due to war activities. After the complete liberation of The Netherlands, the NS main service center in Tilburg fully restored the locomotive. The locomotive was restored to the brown outfit of the NRS, with its original number 107. The locomotive has been on display in the Spoorwegmuseum since March 1955. After the completion of modernization of the Spoorwegmuseum, completed in 2005, the locomotive can be viewed from the bottom as well.

== HSM 359-408 (NS 1610-1659) ==
The HSM was impressed by the service of the locomotive, and ordered an additional 40 locomotives at Sharp, Stewart and Company. These additional locomotives had a wider smokebox, a chimney with a crown and rising support plates next to the smokebox. The additional units entered service between 1891 and 1892, with numbers 359–398. In 1900 five more locomotives were ordered from Sharp, Stewart and delivered with numbers 399–403.

In 1903 another five units were added to the order. These locomotives were built by the North British Locomotive Company, into which Sharp, Stewart was included. They were numbered 404–408. In 1921 the locomotives were renumbered in NS 1610–1659. These last units had a higher steam pressure and a higher tractive force of 5,030 kgf (49.3 kN; 11,100 lbf). The steam dome was located further to the rear on the boiler.

Later in their career nine locomotives (350-358) received tenders from HSM 600 series locomotives (601-605 and 609–612) when these units entered service in 1895 and 1896. These new tenders had larger water and coal capacity and were more suitable for fast-train service. Numbers 1614, 1633, 1636, 1636 and 1646 were superheated in 1921. Due to poor results, the planned application to the other units was cancelled. Units 1614, 1621 and 1640 were fitted with a Weir feeder pump.

The locomotives were withdrawn from service starting from 1936 to 1949. Unit 1614, withdrawn from service in 1938, was used a stationary boiler in Zwolle. In 1940, the locomotive re-entered service, with its superheater elements being shortened. Locomotive 1622 was the last of the series to be withdrawn from service in 1949.

== Rental ==
In 1899 the Nederlandsche Centraal-Spoorweg-Maatschappij (NCS) rented locomotive 105 from the NRS for a few months. As the turntable in Zwolle was too short for the locomotive, the locomotive and tender were disconnected, turned separately and reconnected. The NCS rented 390, 395 and 405 of the HSM for a few months in 1917.

== Overview ==
Manufacturer	Builder Number	Build in	NRS number	SS number	HSM number	NS number	Withdrawn	Details
Sharp Stewart and Company	3557	1889	101	1101	354	1605	1936	
Sharp Stewart and Company	3558	1889	102	1102	355	1606	1935	
Sharp Stewart and Company	3559	1889	103	1103	356	1607	1935	
Sharp Stewart and Company	3560	1889	104		350	1601	1935	
Sharp Stewart and Company	3561	1889	105		351	1602	1935	
Sharp Stewart and Company	3562	1889	106		352	1603	1937	
Sharp Stewart and Company	3563	1889	107		353	1604	1940	Restored to NRS 107 state, and included in collection of Nederlands Spoorwegmuseum.
Sharp Stewart and Company	3564	1889	108	1108	357	1608	1938	
Sharp Stewart and Company	3565	1889	109	1109	358	1609	1938	
Manufacturer	Builder Number	Build In	NRS numbers	SS numbers	HSM numbers	NS numbers	Withdrawn	Details
Sharp Stewart and Company	3740-3747	1891			359-366	1610-1617	1938-1948	NS 1614 lost in WW2.
Sharp Stewart and Company	3748-3759	1892			367-378	1618-1629	1936-1949	
Sharp Stewart and Company	3814-3833	1892			379-398	1630-1649	1936-1948	
Sharp Stewart and Company	4620-4624	1900			399-403	1650-1654	1938-1947	
North British Locomotive Company	15898-15902	1903			404-408	1655-1659	1937-1948	
